= Abu Shabab family =

Palestinian political family

Abu Shabab family Abu Shabab clan
- Parent family: Tarabin Bedouin; Gaza Tarabin
- Country: Popular Forces administration in the Gaza Strip
- Members: List: Yasser Abu Shabab Amna Abu Shabab Hassan Abu Shabab Fathi Abu Shabab Ibrahim Abu Shabab Other members (unnamed)

The Abu Shabab family also called Abu Shabab clan is a family in the Gaza Strip, which belongs to the Gaza Tarabin tribe of the Tarabin Bedouin tribe. The family came into spotlight in 2024, similar to the Soufi family of Shadi Soufi. Yasser Abu Shabab a member of the family established the Popular Forces, a group which is opposed to the Hamas in 2024. Since 2024, the Popular Forces have fought against Hamas.

== Political and military activities ==
Yasser Abu Shabab established the anti-Hamas organization Popular Forces in 2024, which became active in May 2024. Yasser Abu Shabab became its leader and Fathi Abu Shabab (died in November 2024) and Ibrahim Abu Shabab became member of the group. One year later, it was reported that Popular Forces captured there first territory on the 6 May 2025, with that the Popular Forces administration in the Gaza Strip was established, which is led by the leader of the Popular Forces, after Yasser Abu Shabab died on 4 December 2025, Ghassan Duhine became on the same day the new leader, however Duhine was already before the death of Yasser Abu Shabab, the de facto leader.

== Members ==
- Yasser Abu Shabab (1990/1993–2025), Leader of the Popular Forces from 2024 until 2025
- Amna Abu Shabab (born ?), wife of Yasser
- Hassan Abu Shabab (born ?), son of Yasser and Amna
- Fathi Abu Shabab (?–2024), brother of Yasser
- Ibrahim Abu Shabab (?), cousin of Yasser
- Other members, which are unnamed

== See also ==
- Hilles clan
- Doghmush clan
- Sinwar family
