= Zeitoun =

Zeitoun, Zaïtoun, Zeytoun, Żejtun, Zaytoon, Zaytoun, Zeitun, Zitouna, or Zeita (all derived from the Arabic word for "olive tree") may refer to:

== People ==
- Abdullah Abu Zaitoun, Jordanian footballer
- Mohammed Dib Zaitoun, Syrian politician and army general
- Ariel Zeitoun (born 1945), French film director and producer
- Oren Zeitouni, Israeli former professional association football player
- Nassif Zeytoun, Syrian singer
- Shimʿun Zaytuni, 8th century Syriac bishop of Harran
- Zaitoon Bano (1938 – 2021), Pakistani poet

== Places ==
=== Armenia ===
- Kanaker-Zeytun District, a district in Yerevan, the capital of Armenia
  - Nor Zeytun, a town in this district

=== Iran ===
- Zeytun, Jahrom, Fars Province
- Zeytun, Rostam, Fars Province
- Zeytun, Kohgiluyeh and Boyer-Ahmad
- Zeytun-e Sofla, Kohgiluyeh and Boyer-Ahmad

=== Malta ===
- Żejtun
- Għajn Żejtuna, an area in the town of Mellieħa

=== Palestine ===
- Zaytun Quarter, a quarter of Gaza's Old City
- Zeitoun, Gaza, a district of Gaza City
- Zeita (disambiguation), various towns called Zeita or Zeyta in the West Bank
- Ein al-Zeitun, a depopulated village in Palestine

=== Other places ===
- Zitouna, El Taref, a district in Skikda Province, Algeria
- Zaytun or Zaitun, former names of the Chinese city of Quanzhou
- Zeitoun, Cairo, also El-Zeitoun, a district of Cairo, Egypt
- Zetounion, a former name of the Greek city Lamia
- Zeytun, a former name of Süleymanlı, Kahramanmaraş Province, Turkey

== Other uses ==
- Zeitoun (book), a 2009 nonfiction book by Dave Eggers
  - Abdulrahman Zeitoun, the main character in the book
- Zaytoon, a persian restaurant chain based in Dublin, Ireland
- Zeytoon Parvardeh, an olive-based appetizer
- Zaytoun (film), an Israeli film
- Zaytoun (organisation), a non-profit organisation marketing Palestinian olive oil products
- Zaytouna Primary School, a muslim faith free school in Derby, England

== See also ==
- Zeitun Resistance (disambiguation), resistance by Armenian militia in Süleymanlı
