= Zeytun, Iran =

Zeytun (Persian: زيتون) in Iran may refer to:

- Zeytun, Jahrom, Fars Province
- Zeytun, Rostam, Fars Province
- Zeytun, Kohgiluyeh and Boyer-Ahmad
- Zeytun-e Sofla
