= Iran and the Islamic State =

Iran–Islamic State conflict
- Part of the war against the Islamic State
Date	2011–present
Location	Middle East
Status	Ongoing

Belligerents
Iran	Islamic State

Units involved
Government of Iran; Islamic Revolutionary Guard Corps; Quds Force; Islamic Republic of Iran Army; Islamic Republic of Iran Ground Forces	Khorasan Province

Iran is an opponent of the Islamic State of Iraq and Syria (ISIS, Arabic: داعش, romanized: Daesh), (Note: Known as Daesh by Iran and other Muslim countries.) having fought the group in Syria, Iraq, Yemen, as well as directly in Iran. Proxy conflicts have also occurred in other regions such as spillover from Egypt (Islamic State – Sinai Province) into Gaza (Salafi jihadist insurgency in the Gaza Strip), Syria (Islamic State – Lebanon Province) into Lebanon, and Pakistan (Islamic State – Khorasan Province and Islamic State – Pakistan Province) into Iran (Insurgency in Sistan and Balochistan).

== Iran's military action against ISIS ==
=== In Syria ===
Since the start of the Syrian Civil War in 2011, Iran has supported Assad's Syrian Arab Republic against its opponents, including ISIS.

=== In Iraq ===
Iran was the first country to pledge assistance to Iraq to fight ISIS, deploying troops in early June 2014 following the North Iraq offensive.

President of Iraq Fuad Masum has praised Iran as "the first country to provide weapons to Iraq to fight against the ISIS Takfiri terrorists".

Iran's Quds Force is a "key player" in the military intervention against ISIS, and its "mastermind" commander, Major General Qasem Soleimani, maintained a frequent presence in Iraq while his pictures on the battlefield were regularly published.

=== Iran–Iraq border ===
On 14 March 2016, two ISIS cells equipped with explosive devices were eliminated near the border by the Ground Forces of Islamic Republic of Iran Army.

On 14 July 2026, Iran reports the hanging of two members of Islamic State that were captured in a hideout in the Bamo District after an operation that resulted in several militants and three members of the Islamic Revolutionary Guard Corps being killed.

== Iran's political stance ==
Foreign Affairs Minister of Iran Javad Zarif has described ISIS as an "ideological sibling" to Al-Qaeda, adding "the so-called Islamic State is neither Islamic nor a state".

Supreme Leader of Iran Ali Khamenei has openly commented on the American-led intervention in Iraq and the Combined Joint Task Force:

"On the issue of DAESH (ISIS), they formed a coalition. Of course, they are lying and this is a hypocritical act. They wrote a letter to our Ministry of Foreign Affairs saying, "If you say that America gives weapons to DAESH, this is a lie and we are not supporting them". Well, a short time after that, the photos which showed that America gives weapons to DAESH were published."

=== Designation as "terrorist" ===
Iranian official and semi-official media outlets such as state-run Iran Daily, and IRGC-tied news agencies Fars and Tasnim frequently call ISIS a "terrorist organization" and "Takfiri".

The deputy secretary of the Supreme National Security Council has also called it a "terrorist group".

=== Condemnation of harms to others ===
The Iranian Foreign Ministry issued a condemnation of the Islamic State-inspired 2025 Bondi Beach shooting, with spokesman Esmaeil Baghaei writing on X that "Terror and killing of human beings, wherever committed, is rejected and condemned".

== ISIS attacks and threats to Iran ==
While Iran is a Shia-dominant country, ISIS is ideologically anti-Shia and regards Shias as infidels, having killed thousands of them. After rapidly expanding in Iraq, ISIS became a threat only kilometers away from Iran's western borders. With the Pakistan-based Sunni Jihadist groups in eastern Iran and an ongoing Sistan and Baluchestan insurgency, some are alarmed by the possibility of a wider backlash there.

Iran threatened ISIS that managing to attack Baghdad or the holy shrines of Shia Imams and getting close to the Iran-Iraq border is "over the red lines" and if they are crossed, Iran will engage in direct action.

In September 2014, an Iranian paper, Islamic Republic, quoted Hadana news reporting "ISIS designated Emir for Iran and several of his aides were arrested by security bodies". The report did not name the Emir, and did not say if they had been able to sneak into Iran or were arrested abroad. Neither did it mention which country's security bodies had made the arrest.

In the same month, Minister of Interior Abdolreza Rahmani Fazli announced Iran had arrested several suspected members of ISIS trying to enter Iran. He said that two or three of them have confessed "entering Iran has been among the plans of the ISIS" and dismissed the reports on the ISIS move to recruit members inside Iran, despite noting "this does not mean that the group has not launched a publicity campaign for recruitment".

On 29 January 2015, ISIS announced a new province called Wilayat Khorasan consisting of Afghanistan, Pakistan, and "other nearby lands". Hafiz Saeed Khan was designated as Emir of the province. Pakistani Hafiz Saeed Khan, also known as Mulla Saeed Orakzai, was a former member of the Taliban.

On 7 June 2017, ISIS claimed responsibility for an attack on the Iranian Parliament and the mausoleum of Ayatollah Khomeini. The attack was confirmed to have left 16 dead and was the first instance of an ISIS attack within Iran's borders. There are worries about the implications of this attack on President Hassan Rouhani's "moderation project".

Ahvaz military parade attack happened on 22 September 2018. A military parade was attacked by armed gunmen in the southwestern Iranian city of Ahvaz. The shooters killed 25 people, including soldiers of the Islamic Revolutionary Guard Corps (IRGC) and civilian bystanders.

On 3 January 2024, ISIS claimed responsibility for the Kerman bombings incident that killed nearly 100 Iranian civilians at Qasem Soleimani's burial site.

== Iranian citizens and ISIS ==
Tehran Bureau reports popular support for Iran's military action against ISIS.

According to Al Jazeera, by January 2015, "hundreds" of Iranian Kurds from Iranian Kurdistan crossed the Iran-Iraq border to fight ISIS, mostly joining Iraqi Kurdistan fighters also known as Peshmerga.

Several research works and polls conducted by a security body in Iran have shown that Iran's Sunni community "are not interested in membership in the ISIS". However, Erbil-based website Rudaw cites a Facebook post from the one ISIS page saying that in October 2014, 23 Kurds from Iran had joined the group. Kurdish activist Mokhtar Hoshmand has claimed "20 Iranian Kurdish members of ISIS have been killed and 30 have been injured".

== Axis of Resistance ==
The "Axis of Resistance" is a Western exonym for a set of militant, insurgent and militia factions, groups, and organizations in nearby Middle Eastern States allegedly affiliated with, allied to, or aligned with Iran. Some of these have come into conflict with ISIS-affiliates or sympathizers. Israel, an opponent of Iran, has also armed opposing proxies, some of which have alleged links to ISIS.

=== 2025 ===
In June 2025, Israeli Prime Minister Benjamin Netanyahu said that Israel was arming the Popular Forces, a Rafah-based group led by Yasser Abu Shabab, during the Gaza war. The Popular Forces have been linked to IS; some of its prominent figures have been identified as former IS militants who fought in the Sinai insurgency. Abu Shabab has denied any collaboration with Israel or connections to IS. The researcher and analyst Aymenn Jawad Al-Tamimi disputed claims that the Popular Forces are affiliated with IS; he argued that their use of the Palestinian flag in their logo and uniforms would be unacceptable to IS even as a disguise, and that collaboration with Israel constitutes apostasy from Islam from IS's perspective.

Israeli Prime Minister Netanyahu has reluctantly admitted to arming anti-Hamas factions in the Gaza Strip. Allegations were raised by Avigdor Lieberman and Netanyahu's response was to say, "Israel is working to defeat Hamas in various ways". Some took this as confirmation of the story. Only one of the recipient groups has been publicly identified as the Popular Forces which was founded by Yasser Abu Shabab (who was killed on 4 December 2025). His family responded by disowning him and stating that they wanted him assassinated. A similar reaction to the families of Gazans who conducted suicide bombings against Hamas, in sympathy with ISIS. Yasser Abu Shabab was previously imprisoned by Hamas for criminal offences, but escaped when Gaza's prison was bombed. The move was criticised because previously, Netanyahu supported an anti-PLO group, Hamas, which eventually allied with factions of the PLO against Israel during the second intifada. Leila Molana-Allen said there has been no evidence of Hamas attacking aid convoys. She added that there was no evidence that the groups being armed were loyal to Israel. Allen also said that the Israel-supported militants had previously admitted that the aid being looted previously was "for their fighters". Several months previously, in November 2024, a Hamas government spokesperson said that their security forces had killed twenty looters with links to ISIS.

A high-ranking senior commander, Issam Nabahin, was formerly a member of the Islamic State's Sinai Province. Nabahin was sentenced to death by Hamas in 2023 for independently firing rockets at Israel, before his escape during the Gaza War. Nabahin was captured again by Hamas in 2025, but escaped again after an Israeli drone bombed his prison, allowing him to escape.
