= Zetin =

Zetin (Persian: زتين) may refer to:

- Zetin-e Olya
- Zetin-e Sofla
