= Territory of the Popular Forces =

Rival administration in the Gaza Strip

Popular Forces
- Flag

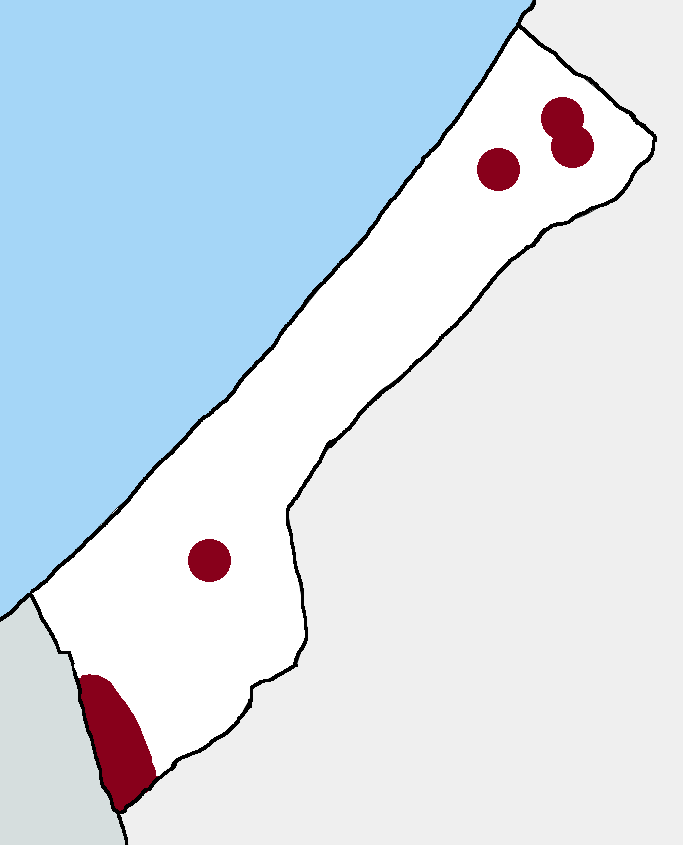
- Areas of influence of the Popular Forces (including claimed territories of the Popular Army – Northern Forces and the Popular Army in Rafah)
- Status: Unrecognized rival administration under Israeli military occupation
- Capital: Al-Bayuk
- Demonym: Gazans

Government
  - Leader: Ghassan Duhine
- Establishment: Gaza war
  - First takeover of territories: 6 May 2025
  - Claim of territory in eastern Rafah: 26 June 2025
  - Claim of territory in northern Gaza: October 2025
  - Spread into Khan Yunis: November 2025
  - Spread into Western Rafah: December 2025

Population
  - 2025 estimate: ~2,000
- Website; Yasser Abu Shabab - Popular Forces

During the Gaza war, the Popular Forces, an anti-Hamas, Israeli-backed, and allegedly Islamic State-linked armed group, has claimed control over large amounts of the Gaza Strip that are currently under Israeli military occupation. This was the first area in Gaza not administrated by Hamas since 2007.

The group claims Al-Bayuk as its capital, and controls parts of eastern Rafah, Khan Yunis, western Rafah, and humanitarian aid routes near the Kerem Shalom border crossing. The Popular Forces have freedom of movement in the wider Rafah area. Furthermore, the Popular Army – Northern Forces, which reportedly operates as part of the Popular Forces, has claimed control over several areas in northern Gaza.

== Background ==
Before the war, the land presently administrated by the Popular Forces belonged to the Tarabin Bedouin tribe, of which Yasser Abu Shabab was a member.

== Territory ==
=== In Southern Gaza ===
In late May 2025, the Rafah Governorate came under full Israeli operational control following its successful Rafah offensive against Hamas, in which the Popular Forces participated. As of 27 June, the group was reportedly in control of eastern Rafah, enjoyed freedom of movement in the wider Rafah area, and was working on building an independent administration. By August, The Washington Post was describing the Popular Forces as "the de facto authority in southeastern Gaza".

The group claims Al-Bayuk, in Southern Gaza as its capital.

=== In Northern Gaza ===
On 14 October, the Popular Forces-aligned Popular Army – Northern Forces claimed it had taken control of several areas in northern Gaza, and warned Hamas forces against approaching their territories. Its flag featuring the logo of PANF, is displayed on its vehicles and facilities within its territory.

== Government ==
After consolidation of Popular Forces control, Abu Shabab began launching a recruitment drive to staff “administrative and community committees,” including doctors and nurses, engineers, teachers and public relations experts. More than 2,000 Palestinian civilians live under the Popular Forces' administration.

=== Public services ===
The Popular Forces began setting up checkpoints in Israeli occupied territory to screen convoys of international aid workers entering Gaza, and claimed they were providing security to aid trucks and civilians. Abu Shabab also said that they have built schools, health centers and other civilian infrastructure, Sky News also reported that medical facilities, a school, and a mosque have been built by the Popular Forces. According to Abu Shabab, civilians within its territory were enjoying a better quality of life, untouched by the humanitarian crisis elsewhere in Gaza.

=== Relations ===
On 24 July, The Wall Street Journal published an opinion piece written by Abu Shabab, where he called on the United States and Arab countries to recognize the Popular Forces' administration.

=== Proposed Transitional Government of East Gaza ===
+972 Magazine claimed that shortly before his death, Abu Shabab was discussing a plan with current leader Ghassan Duhine to form a "Transitional Government of East Gaza", modeled loosely on Sudan’s Rapid Support Forces.

=== Leaders and commanders ===
Name	Role	Status	references
Yasser Abu Shabab	Leader, until 4 December 2025	Fugitive, killed on 4 December 2025	
Ghassan Duhine	Commander of the Popular Forces' armed wing the Counter-Terrorism Service, new leader of the Popular Forces after Yasser Abu Shabab's death.	Wounded on 4 December 2025	
Abu Awad	Spokesperson		
Issam Nabahin	Senior commander	Fugitive	
Ashraf al-Mansi	Leader of the Popular Army – Northern Forces		
Ahmad Zidan al-Tarabin	Responsible for recruiting militants	Executed by Hamas	
Hassan Abu Shabab	Commander and relative of Yasser Abu Shabab		
Shawqi Abu Nasira	Leader of the Free Homeland Forces		
Abu Anas Zeidan	Lieutenant in the Popular Army – Northern Forces		
Khaled Abu Sanida	Chief of staff of the Counter-Terrorism Service		

== See also ==
- Hamas–Popular Forces conflict
- Societal breakdown in the Gaza Strip during the Gaza war
- Counter-Terrorism Strike Force
- Counter-Terrorism Strike Force administration in the Gaza Strip
- Shuja'iyya Popular Defense Forces
- Shuja'iyya Popular Defense Forces administration in the Gaza Strip
- Rival government
- Wartime collaboration
- Project New Gaza
