= Palestinian Civil War =

Palestinian Civil War may refer to:

== Military conflict in Mandatory Palestine ==
- Intercommunal conflict in Mandatory Palestine
- 1947–1948 civil war in Mandatory Palestine

== Military conflict in the State of Palestine or among Palestinians ==
- Palestinian internal political violence
- Fatah–Hamas conflict
- 2009 Hamas political violence in Gaza
- Palestinian Authority–West Bank militias conflict

== See also ==
- Israeli–Palestinian conflict
