= Al-Bayuk =

Town in Rafah, Palestine

Coordinates: 31°16′47″N 34°18′18″E

- Municipality type D (Village council)

Arabic transcription(s)
  - Arabic: البَيُوك
  - Latin: al-Buyuk (official)
- Interactive map of Al-Bayuk
- Location of al-Bayuk within Palestine
- State: (Palestine) State of Palestine; De facto: (Palestine) Popular Forces administration in the Gaza Strip
- Governorate: Rafah

Government
  - Type: Village council
  - Control: Israel; (Palestine) Popular Forces

Population (2024)
  - Total: ~20,000

Al-Bayuk (Arabic: البَيُوك, also spelled al-Buyuk) is a Palestinian village in the eastern Rafah Governorate located in the southern Gaza Strip. According to the Palestinian Central Bureau of Statistics (PCBS), it had a population of 5,648 in 2006. The village has become the de facto capital of the Palestinian anti-Hamas armed group the Popular Forces backed by Israel.

Prior to the 2024 invasion of Rafah, the neighborhood housed more than 20,000 people.

== History ==
Al Bayuk is a small village on the southeastern edge of Rafah, Gaza, historically home to around 5,600 residents. Long overlooked politically, it gained prominence during the Gaza war when the Popular Forces, a clan-based militia led by Yasser Abu Shabab, established control over parts of Al Bayuk, turning it into their operational hub. Backed by Israel, the group used the village’s location near the Kerem Shalom border crossing to control aid routes and expand into Khan Yunis, and now functions as the de facto headquarters for the group.
