= Hilles =

Hilles is a surname. There are 33,000 records of people with the surname Hilles. Notable people with the surname include:

- Charles D. Hilles, American politician from Ohio, chairman of the Republican National Committee
- Florence Bayard Hilles (1865–1954), American suffragist
- Robert Hilles, Canadian poet and novelist
- Hilles clan, Palestinian extended family
