= Ghassan Duhine =

Leader of the Popular Forces (born 1987)

Leader of the Popular Forces
- Incumbent
- Assumed office 4 December 2025
- Preceded by: Yasser Abu Shabab

Second-in-Command of the Popular Forces
- In office Unknown – 4 December 2025
- Preceded by: Unknown
- Succeeded by: Unknown

Commander of Popular Forces' military wing Counter-Terrorism Service
- Incumbent
- Assumed office 2024

Personal details
- Born: Ghassan Duhine; 3 October 1987 (age 39) Amman, Jordan

Military service
- Allegiance: Popular Forces administration (2024–present) Formerly: (Palestine) Palestinian Authority (until 2007); (Islamic State) Army of Islam (2007–?) (Note: Pro-Hamas media outlets have indicated that Duhine is no longer with the Army of Islam, though the year of his departure is unknown.)
- Unit: (Palestine) Counter-Terrorism Service (Palestine) Palestinian National Security Forces (formerly)
- Battles/wars: Israeli–Palestinian conflict; Gaza–Israel conflict; Gaza war; Palestinian internal political violence; Salafi jihadist insurgency in the Gaza Strip; Hamas–Popular Forces conflict; 2025 Rafah ambush (WIA)

Ghassan Duhine (Arabic: غسان الدهيني; born 3 October 1987) is the second and current leader of the Israeli-backed Popular Forces armed group in the Gaza Strip. Following the killing of the group's founder Yasser Abu Shabab in a dispute with the Abu Suneima family on 4 December 2025, Duhine declared himself the new leader of the group. Ghassan served as the commander of the Popular Forces' military wing Counter-Terrorism Service and formerly a senior commander to Yasser Abu Shabab.

== Personal life ==
Duhine was born on 3 October 1987 in Amman, Jordan. Duhine claims to have graduated from the Dar al-Hadith institute for Shari‘i Sciences.

Public information about Duhine's early life is limited, though regional analysts generally identify him as originating from the Tarabin clan based in the Rafah area.

According to local reporting, Duhine worked in the training branch of the Palestinian National Security Apparatus prior to the 2007 Battle of Gaza, and has been described by media outlets as a former fighter within the Army of Islam, a Gaza-based Salafi jihadist militant group aligned with the Islamic State (IS). He was allegedly jailed in the past for criminal offences including drug trafficking.

During the Gaza war, Duhine became the Popular Forces' second-in-command, under Yasser Abu Shabab. In December 2025, after Abu Shabab was killed, Duhin succeeded him as leader of the Popular Forces. Al Jazeera English reported that according to Palestinian media sources, Duhine may have been the group's de facto leader long before he officially succeeded Abu Shaha.

Duhine refers to himself as a Salafi Muslim.

== See also ==
- Salafi jihadist militant groups in the Gaza Strip
- Israel and state-sponsored terrorism
- Gaza humanitarian crisis
- Salafi jihadist insurgency in the Gaza Strip
- Societal breakdown in the Gaza Strip during the Gaza war
- Wartime collaboration
