= Shuja'iyya Popular Defense Forces =

Israeli-backed Palestinian militant group

- Other name: Popular Defense Army
- Leaders: Rami Hilles; Ahmed Jundeya
- Dates active: 2025 – present
- Split from: (Fatah) Hilles clan Jundeya clan
- Country: Palestine
- Headquarters: Shuja'iyya, Gaza City
- Active regions: Eastern Gaza City (including Shuja'iyya, Zaytun, and Tuffah neighbourhoods)
- Ideology: Anti-Hamas
- Wars: Gaza–Israel conflict; Gaza war; 2025 Shuja'iyya offensive; Hamas–Popular Forces conflict; Fatah–Hamas conflict

The Shuja'iyya Popular Defense Forces (Arabic: قوات الدفاع الشعبي للشجاعية, romanized: Quwwat al-Diffa al-Sha'bi lil-Shuja'yia) is an Israeli-backed anti-Hamas militant group in the Gaza Strip led and founded by Rami Hilles and Ahmed Jundeya. Operating within the Israeli-controlled side of the Yellow Line, the group is based in the Shuja'iyya neighborhood of Gaza City, and is also active in the adjacent Zeitoun and Tuffah neighborhoods. The group is composed of dozens of fighters primarily drawn from the Hilles clan and the Jundeya clan.

The Shuja'iyya Popular Defense Forces was erroneously initially conflated with the entire Hilles clan, but is now known to be a "rogue faction" that has been disavowed by clan leadership.

== Background ==
During the course of the Gaza war, societal breakdown across the Gaza Strip caused by offensives launched by the Israel Defense Forces has caused: starvation, famine, lack of supplies and a weaker Hamas created by the conflict has led to the rise of anti-Hamas armed elements in the Gaza Strip.

Rami Hilles is a former member of the Palestinian Authority's Security Services, and is from the Tel al-Hawa neighbourhood of Gaza City. Like the rest of the Hilles clan, he is reportedly aligned with Fatah.

== History ==
By July 2025, during Israel's offensive in Shuja'iyya, a group led by Rami Hilles was active and receiving Israeli protection and operational cover, though Ynet misidentified it as the entire Hilles clan and misidentified Rami Hilles as clan leader. The clan later denied any collaboration with Israel.

According to the Meir Amit Intelligence and Terrorism Information Center, citing Palestinian media, by September, the Shuja'iyya Popular Defense Forces was conducting surveillance, attacks, and abductions under the supervision of an Israeli intelligence officer.

Clashes between Hamas and the Shuja'iyya Popular Defense Forces subsequently intensified. Hamas forces attacked the SPDF group, which retreated eastward alongside withdrawing Israeli forces.

On 4 January 2026, gunmen affiliated with the Shuja'iyya Popular Defense Forces moved into the Sanafour Junction in Al-Tuffah. As the gunmen entered Al-Tuffah, they were met with gunfire from Hamas and allied gunmen. The shootout lasted around 20 minutes and left 2 Hamas militants, before the SPDF retreated into the Israeli-controlled side of the "Yellow Line".

== Administration in the Gaza Strip ==
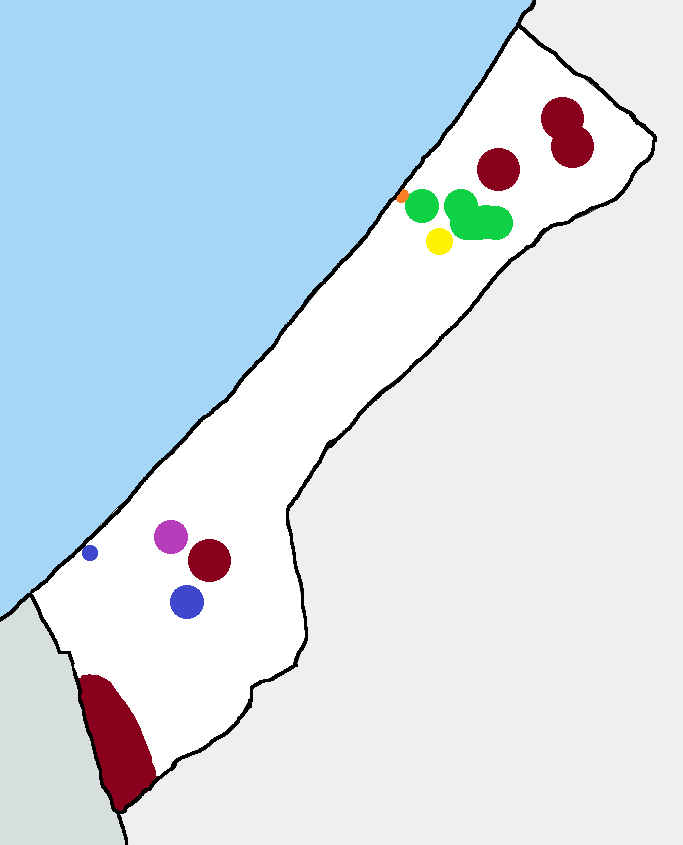
Shuja'iyya–controlled territory (November 2025)

Within the Israeli-controlled side of the Yellow Line, the SPDF is based in the Shuja'iyya neighborhood of Gaza City, and is also active in nearby Zeitoun and Tuffah. Leader of the SPDF, Rami Hilles claims to have 500 people within his territory as of November 2025.

According to Rami Hilles, the group provides humanitarian services in Shuja'iyya and allegedly coordinates with the Palestinian Authority (PA).

== See also ==
- Project New Gaza
