= Killing of Yasser Abu Shabab =

2025 ambush near Rafah which led to the death of Yasser Abu Shabab

- Part of the Hamas–Popular Forces conflict and Palestinian internal political violence
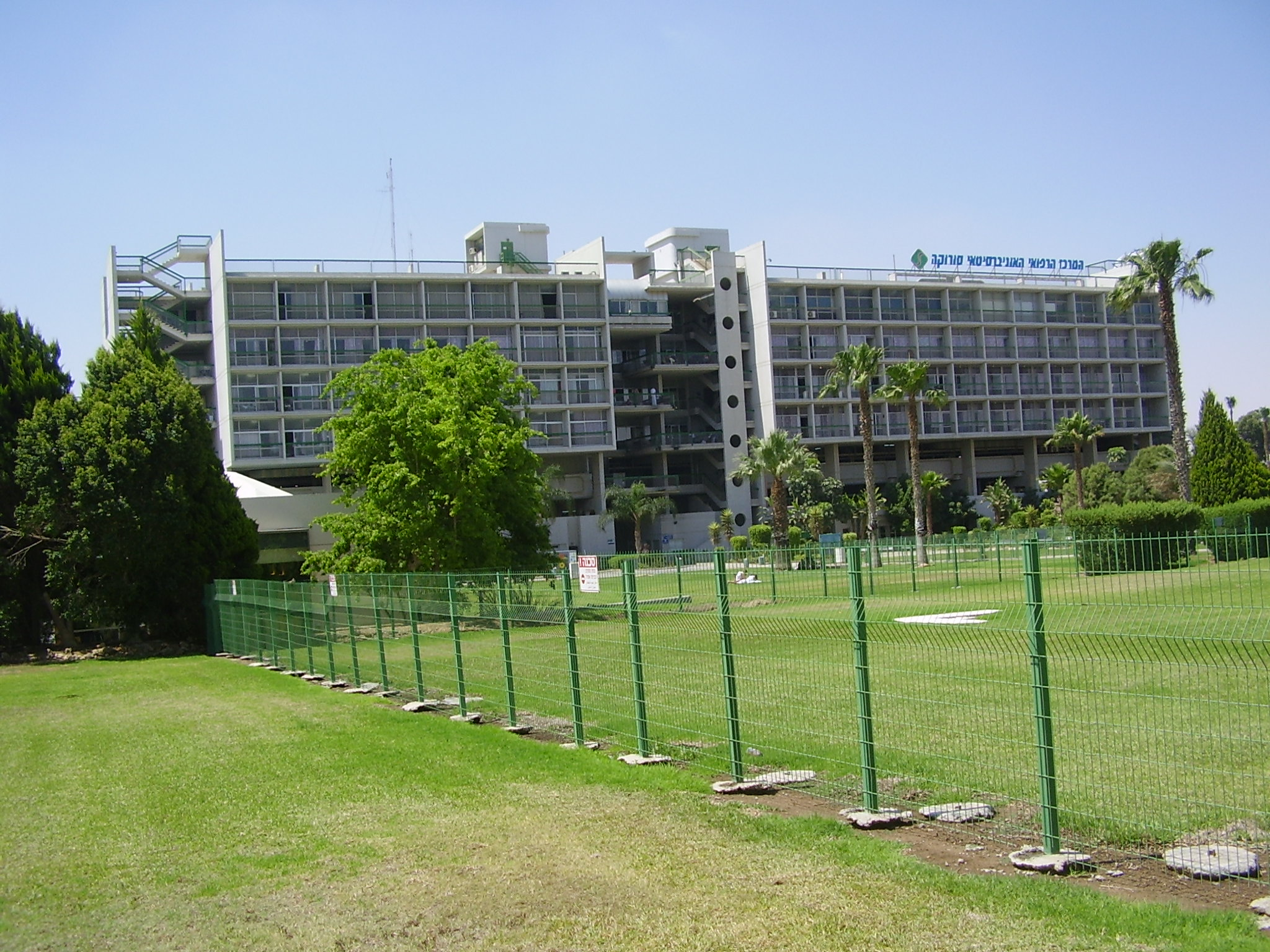
- Soroka Medical Center, Beersheba, where Abu Shabab was headed when he died of his wounds
- Location: Popular Forces' base, Rafah, Popular Forces' territory, Gaza Strip
- Date: 4 December 2025 (UTC+03:00)
- Target: Yasser Abu Shabab
- Attack type: Assassination, torture killing
- Deaths: 3 (Shabab, 2 perpetrators)
- Injuries: 1 (Duhine)
- Perpetrators: Abu Suneima family; Rogue-Popular Forces members
- Assailants: Juma Abu Suneima †; Mahmoud Abu Suneima †

On 4 December 2025, clashes between the Abu Suneima family and the Israeli-backed Popular Forces militia took place in eastern Rafah in the Gaza Strip. The confrontation resulted in the death of Yasser Abu Shabab, the leader of the Popular Forces, after he was critically wounded in a gun battle stemming from a dispute over the detention of a member of the Abu Suneima family. 3 other people were killed or wounded in the fighting, including Ghassan Duhine.

The circumstances surrounding Abu Shabab's death were disputed. The Popular Forces stated that he was killed while attempting to mediate a family dispute, while other reports described the incident as an internal conflict involving members of the militia and the Abu Suneima family. Abu Shabab's killing was followed by retaliatory actions by the Popular Forces, the succession of Duhine as the group's leader, and public celebrations by Hamas supporters and some Palestinians in Gaza and Lebanon. Hamas authorities hailed the killing and launched a campaign encouraging members of Israeli-backed Palestinian militias to surrender.

== Background ==
=== Yasser Abu Shabab ===
Yasser Abu Shabab was a Palestinian militant leader who led an armed group called the Popular Forces. His group controlled parts of eastern Rafah and set up a rival government against the Hamas government during the Gaza war.

Abu Shabab's brother, Fathi, had previously been killed by the Arrow Unit in November 2024. In January 2025, Hamas executed one of his senior aides.

==== Family rejection and tribal repercussions ====
Abu Shabab's family disowned him for "supporting the Zionist occupation forces" and said they "have no objection to those around him liquidating him immediately". Members of Abu Shabab's extended family had also dissociated themselves from him due to his collaboration with Israel.

The Abu Suneima Family, which is based in East Rafah and whose members killed Abu Shabab, belong to the Tarabin Bedouin tribe, the same tribe as Yasser Abu Shabab.

=== Previous assassination attempts on Abu Shabab ===
Hamas had placed Abu Shabab in their top targets for assassination, which led to them twice trying to kill him, unsuccessfully.

During one unsuccessful attempt to ambush and assassinate Abu Shabab, militants fired approximately 90 bullets at a vehicle they thought belonged to him. The vehicle actually belonged to Islam Hijazi, a female aid worker of charity organization named Heal Palestine and she was accidentally killed in this incident by fighters who mistakenly thought she was Abu Shabab.

In another failed attempt in November 2024, Abu Shabab survived an assassination attempt by Hamas at the European Hospital in Khan Yunis. He managed to flee but two of his associates were killed.

== Attack ==
Following an internal investigation, the Popular Forces' deputy leader, Ghassan Duhine, detained Juma Abu Suneima on the suspicion of diverting food supplies to Hamas militants. Juma's brother, Mahmoud Abu Suneima, who was responsible for overseeing the distribution of food to the Popular Forces and other local families, demanded his release.

Mahmoud later went to Abu Shabab's residence to demand Juma's release. He was reportedly informed that Juma faced three possible outcomes: continued detention, transfer to the Israeli military, or execution. The confrontation escalated into armed violence, during which Mahmoud opened fire. Abu Shabab was critically wounded and later died after being evacuated to Soroka Medical Center in Beersheba, Israel. Both Mahmoud and Juma were killed in the ensuing clashes with Ghassan Duhine also being wounded in his left leg. The attackers reportedly chanted pro-Hamas slogans.

The Abu Suneima family claimed responsibility for Abu Shabab's killing. The Abu Suneima Family, which is based in East Rafah, belongs to the Tarabin Bedouin tribe, ironically the same tribe as Yasser Abu Shabab.

== Aftermath ==
Abu Shabab died of his wounds shortly before arriving at the Soroka Medical Center in Beersheba, Israel; the hospital has denied that he died under their care. Deputy Commander of the group, Ghassan Duhine, was also wounded in action.

Following Yasser Abu Shabab's death, Ghassan Duhine proclaimed himself the new leader of the Popular Forces.

=== Popular forces' counter-attacks ===
Duhine, who was wounded during the confrontation, received medical treatment in Israel before returning to oversee a series of executions. Those killed reportedly included Abu Shabab's bodyguards, who were accused of failing to intervene, as well as the gunman, his detained brother, and several others. Duhine also allegedly ordered attacks on homes belonging to the Abu Suneima family, during which several residents were wounded, mobile phones were confiscated, women were assaulted, and families were placed under lockdown.

== Reactions ==
=== Popular Forces ===
In an official statement, the Popular Forces had dismissed claims that Abu Shabab's death was "caused by a Hamas attack". The group also claimed to continue in Yasser Abu Shabab's path. The Popular Forces stated that Yasser had been killed by gunshot wound while trying to resolve a conflict between members of the Abu Suneima family in Eastern Rafah.

Yedioth Ahronoth reported that Abu Shabab was killed due to an internal dispute within the Popular Forces, however the group itself claims that he was killed while trying to resolve a dispute in a local family.

=== Israeli-backed militias in Gaza ===
Husam al-Astal, leader of the Counter-Terrorism Strike Force claimed that Yasser Abu Shabab was either killed due to personal matters or a dispute with money.

Ashraf al-Mansi, leader of the Popular Army – Northern Forces, offered his group's sympathy and condolences to Abu Shabab's family. Al-Mansi said that the PANF "remained committed to working against Hamas' terrorism and extremism".

Shawqi Abu Nuseira, leader of the Free Homeland Forces, said in a video statement, “We are all Abu Shabab,” and vowed that his group would continue in its fight against Hamas.

=== Abu Suneima family ===
The Abu Suneima family, in its own statement, said that at least two sons from the family were responsible for ambushing and killing Abu Shabab. The family also said in its statement that Yasser Abu Shabab and his armed group, the Popular Forces, "stand outside of the values of our family" and "will face a harsh reckoning" by the family.

=== Hamas-led government in Gaza ===
Later on the day of the ambush, the Gaza Interior Ministry-affiliated internal security force, Quwwat al-Rada'a (also known as "The Deterrence Force"), posted a picture of Yasser Abu Shabab on its Telegram channel, captioned: "As we told you, 'Israel won't protect you'." Gaza's interior ministry called Abu Shabab's death "the inevitable fate of every traitor" and urged the remaining Israeli-backed Palestinian militants to hand themselves in "before it is too late."

Government-affiliated security forces in Gaza had announced a new operation called "Operation Opening the Gates of Repentance" after the killing of Yasser Abu Shabab. It was aimed at giving a chance to so-called "collaborators supported by Israel", to surrender to security forces. By 19 December 2025, the operation ended. According to the Izz al-Din Brigades combat information Telegram channel, those who were involved with anti-Hamas militias and had turned themselves in were having their files being dealt with, while those who hadn't surrendered would continued to be hunted and targeted by the security apparatus of Gaza.

=== Palestinian public ===
Palestinians in Gaza and those in Palestinian refugee camps in Lebanon celebrated Yasser Abu Shabab's death, with some handing out sweets and performing celebratory gunfire.
