= Issam Nabahin =

Palestinian anti-Hamas militant

- عصام نباهين
- Born: Nuseirat refugee camp, Gaza Strip
- Military career
- Allegiance: (Palestine) Popular Forces administration
- Service years: Islamic State: mid-2010s – ? (Note: According to Hassan Abu Shabab, Nabahin left IS by the time he joined the Popular Forces.) (Palestine) Popular Forces: 2024 – present
- Conflicts: Sinai insurgency; Gaza–Israel conflict (2023); Hamas–Popular Forces conflict
- Criminal information
- Status: Fugitive
- Penalty: Death (2023)
- Wanted by: Hamas
- Escaped: 7 October 2023 (first escape), 11 June 2025 (second escape)

Details
- Date apprehended: 2023 (first arrest), 9 June 2025 (second arrest)

Issam Nabahin (Note: Arabic: عصام نباهين) is a Palestinian militant who is a senior commander in the Popular Forces, an anti-Hamas militia in the Gaza Strip formerly led by Yasser Abu Shabab and as of 5 December 2025 led by Ghassan Duhine.

== Early life ==
Nabahin is from the Nuseirat refugee camp in central Gaza.

== Activity in and involvement with the Islamic State ==
He joined the Sinai Province branch of the Islamic State (IS) in the mid-2010s, and was reportedly involved in the Sinai insurgency and the killing of civilians. In 2015, Hamas identified Nabahin as an IS militant and a suspect in a bombing of Hamas vehicles. In 2016, Egyptian intelligence also identified him as an IS militant. Nabahin evaded capture from both Hamas and Egypt.

== Return to Gaza, first arrest, and escape ==
In 2023, Nabahin returned to Gaza and was documented launching rockets at Israel independently from Hamas. He was sentenced to death by Hamas but managed to escape prison on 7 October, the day the Gaza war began.

== Role in the Popular Forces ==
Hassan Abu Shabab, a Popular Forces commander and relative of Yasser Abu Shabab, says that Nabahin "broke from terrorism" and joined the Popular Forces when the group was formed in May 2024. By June 2025, when Israeli support for the group was first revealed, Nabahin was identified as one of the "key figures in Abu Shabab's inner circle".

== Second arrest and escape ==
On 9 June 2025, Hamas forces ambushed a car transporting Nabahin, capturing him. After his capture, Hamas charged him with espionage and murder. Two days later, per Hamas-linked media, an Israeli drone bombed Nabahin's detention cell and his fate was reported to be "unclear". Then, on 18 June, he posted a video on Facebook confirming he was alive and heading to southern Gaza. By August, Nabahin was back in Popular Forces-controlled eastern Rafah.

== See also ==
- Societal breakdown in the Gaza Strip during the Gaza war
