= 2025 Hamas executions =

Executions and extrajudicial killings in the Gaza Strip

- Part of the Gaza War, the Gaza–Israel conflict, the Israeli–Palestinian conflict, the Hamas–Popular Forces conflict, and the Middle Eastern crisis (2023–present)
- Location: Palestinian-administered areas of the Gaza Strip
- Date: 19 September – 21 October 2025 (1 month and 2 days)
- Target: Popular Forces soldiers
- Attack type: Executions, extrajudicial killings
- Deaths: 33+ executed
- Perpetrators: Ministry of Interior of the Gaza Strip; Gaza Police; Arrow Unit; Internal Security Services; Rad'a Force
- Motive: Executing criminals, bandits, collaborators, and opponents

The 2025 Hamas executions were a wave of public executions and extrajudicial killings conducted by Hamas in the Gaza Strip between September and October 2025. The executions were documented both by video footage on social media and international reports of the events, showing armed men shooting kneeling men in the back of their heads. These events took place before and after the Gaza peace plan was finalized.

== Background ==
Hamas has executed suspected Palestinian Israel collaborators and Fatah rivals during previous conflicts. According to the Associated Press, collaborating with Israel is a crime punishable by death in Gaza. Hundreds of Palestinians were executed by Hamas during the First Intifada. In the wake of the 2006 Gaza–Israel conflict, Hamas was accused of systematically rounding up, torturing and summarily executing Fatah supporters suspected of supplying information to Israel. In November 2012, Hamas publicly executed six Gaza residents accused of collaborating with Israel. During the 2014 Gaza War, Hamas executed at least 23 accused collaborators, with Amnesty International also reporting instances of torture used by Hamas forces.

In October 2025, just before and following a ceasefire in the 2023–present Gaza War and the implementation of the Gaza peace plan, Hamas began a wave of executions throughout the Gaza Strip. It was described by various analysts speaking with The New York Times as part of an attempt by Hamas to maintain authority within the Gaza Strip. The Guardian wrote that these incidents raised concerns regarding Hamas' disarmament ("a key though ill-defined provision of..." the peace plan), though Donald Trump said that the group was compliant with the deal.

== 2025 executions ==
On 19 September 2025, Hamas carried out public executions, accusing those killed of being spies for Israel. Other alleged collaborators with Israel turned themselves in, with some "being prepared for reintegration into society." The event was filmed and posted on social media.

On 21 September, a Palestinian official said that Hamas-led authorities have executed three men who allegedly had ties with Abu Shabab after they were accused of collaborating with Israel. The execution took place on a street outside of Al-Shifa Hospital in Gaza City.

On 22 September 2025, Hamas executed three men who were suspected of cooperating with Israel. They were made to kneel while blindfolded and shot in public, as seen on videos published online.

On 28 September, a Popular Forces operative was executed by Hamas security forces.

On 13 October, Hamas forces publicly executed Ahmad Zidan al-Tarabin, reportedly responsible for recruiting agents for the Popular Forces.

On 14 and 15 October, more videos were published that showed Hamas members forcing men to kneel and then shooting them from close range.

On 21 October, Hamas announced they would pause public executions so as not to provide Israel a pretext to break the ceasefire.

== Casualties ==
The exact number of executions is still unclear. As of mid-October 2025, multiple sources say a total of 33 men have been killed.

== Reaction ==
=== Opposition ===
Humanitarian organizations and governments spoke out against the executions and called for accountability. The Palestinian Authority strongly condemned Hamas' actions. President Mahmoud Abbas labeled the killings a "crime against the Palestinian people". The Al-Mezan Center for Human Rights, a Palestinian NGO, called the incidents "extrajudicial execution[s] of citizens". United States President Donald Trump warned that if Hamas continued to kill people in Gaza, "we will have no choice but to go in and kill them", despite initially being indifferent to what he justified as Hamas having "taken out a couple of gangs that were very bad."

Moumen al-Natour, a Palestinian lawyer, former Hamas political prisoner, and president of Palestinian Youth for Development, stated that these measures are Hamas's way to regain control over the Gaza Strip. He said that "They are sending a signal that they are back — by terrorizing people".

=== Defence and justification ===
In an interview with Reuters on 17 October 2025, Hamas official Mohammed Nazzal defended the executions, saying that they are "exceptional measures", and those who were executed were criminals guilty of killing.

== See also ==
- Human rights in the Gaza Strip
- Capital punishment in the Gaza Strip
- Arrow Unit
