= Parliament Street, Dublin =

Street in Dublin, Ireland

Parliament Street
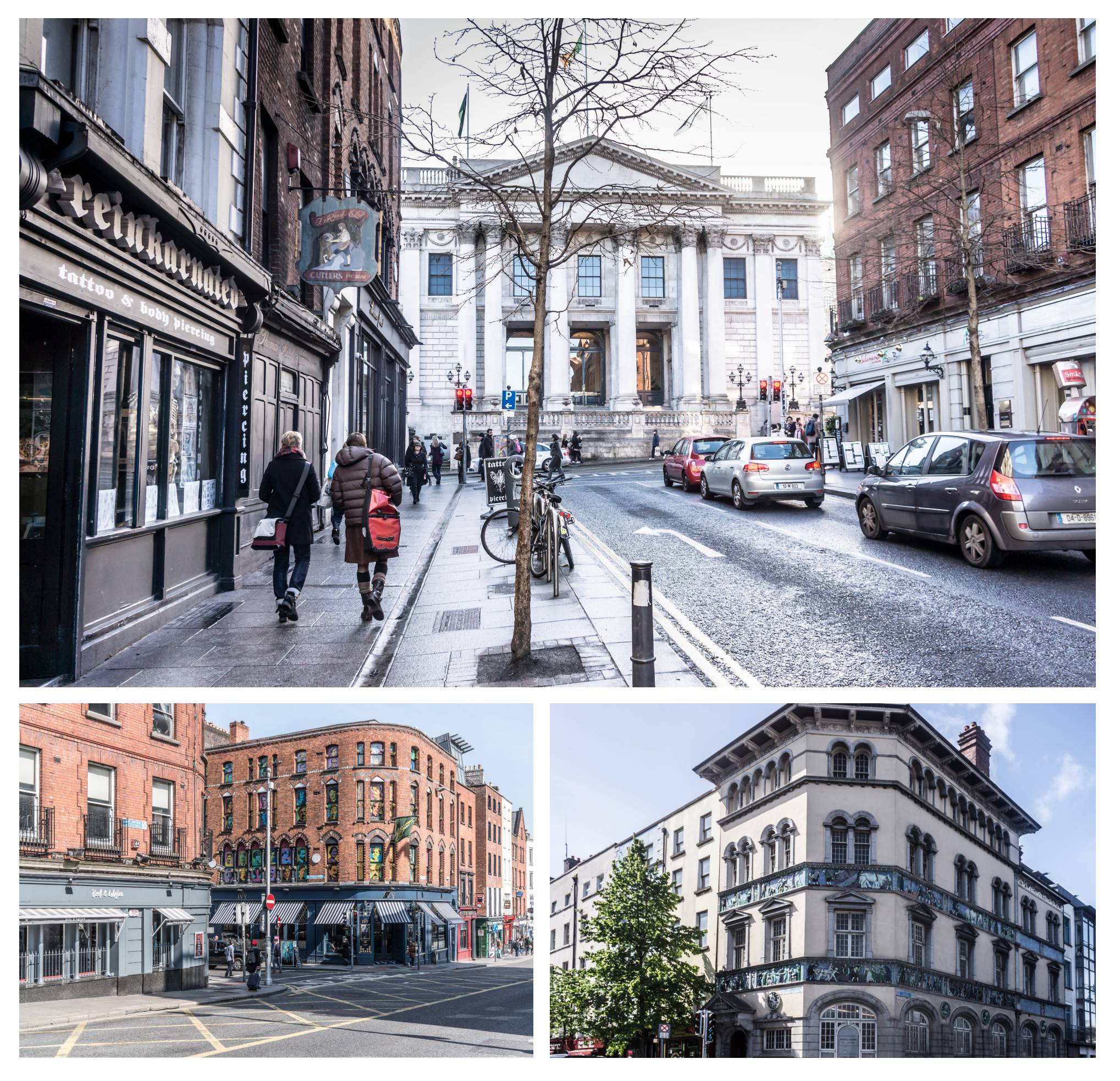
- Clockwise from top: Dublin City Hall as seen from Parliament Street; Sunlight Chambers; Parliament Street at the junction of Dame Street and Cork Hill

- Location within Central Dublin
- Native name: Sráid na Parlaiminte (Irish)
- Postal code: D02
- Coordinates: 53.3452°N 6.2679°W

Parliament Street (Irish: Sráid na Pairliminte) is a street located on Dublin's Southside. It runs from the junction of Dame Street and Cork Hill on its southern end to the junction of Essex Quay and Wellington Quay on its northern end where it joins directly onto Grattan Bridge and subsequently Capel Street.

== History ==
Parliament Street was created in the early 1760s by the Wide Streets Commission to open up a direct route to Dublin Castle with retail buildings on either side. It was the first project to be undertaken by the Commission, created after an act of Parliament, and was the origin of the name. The Parliament Street Act 1757 (31 Geo. 2. c. 19 (I)) allowed for the land and associated houses to be purchased for £12,000 to create the new street.

== Notable buildings ==
=== Sunlight Chambers ===
One of the street's notable buildings is Sunlight Chambers, which was built as offices for Lord Lever of Lever Brothers. It has frontages on Parliament Street and Essex Quay. Lever also planned Port Sunlight in Liverpool. The structure is designed in a "romantic Italianate style with wide overhanging eaves, tiled roof, and arcaded upper floors”. It also has "two multi-coloured terracotta friezes depicting the history of hygiene”.

=== City Hall ===
City Hall, Dublin, originally the Royal Exchange, forms a terminating vista on Parliament Street. The structure was built between 1769 and 1779 and designed by the architect Thomas Cooley. It is the formal seat of Dublin City Council.

== Notable businesses ==
- Porterhouse Brewery and bar
- Zaytoon persian restaurant

== See also ==
- List of streets and squares in Dublin
