= Popular Army – Northern Forces =

Israeli-backed Palestinian militia

- الجيش الشعبي – القوات الشمال
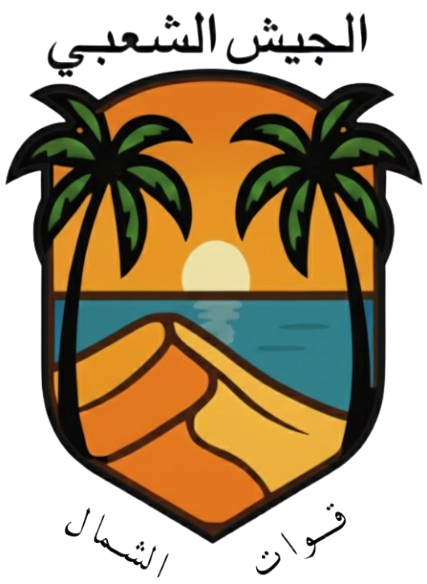
- Other name: People's Army – Northern Forces
- Leader: Ashraf al-Mansi
- Dates active: 2025 – present
- Country: Palestine
- Allegiance: Popular Forces administration
- Headquarters: Ezbet Beit Hanoun Elementary School, Northern Gaza
- Active regions: Northern Gaza (primarily Jabalia and Beit Lahiya)
- Ideology: Anti-Hamas; Islamism (alleged)
- Size: ~40
- Part of: (Palestine) Popular Forces
- Wars: Gaza–Israel conflict; Gaza war; Hamas–Popular Forces conflict

The Popular Army – Northern Forces (PA-NF; Arabic: الجيش الشعبي – القوات الشمال) or People's Army – Northern Forces is an Israeli-backed anti-Hamas Palestinian militant group in the northern Gaza Strip that operates as part of the Popular Forces. It is led by Ashraf Al-Mansi.

== Background ==
During the Gaza war, societal breakdown across the Gaza Strip caused by offensives by the Israel Defense Forces on Palestinian law enforcement institutions as well as starvation, famine, and lack of supplies created by the conflict has led to the rise of anti-Hamas armed groups in the Gaza Strip.

== History and operations ==
The group's leader, Ashraf al-Mansi, had a criminal background before he officially founded the Popular/People's Army–Northern Forces.

In October, the PA-NF held a military parade following the ceasefire on 10 October in northern Gaza. That same month, the PA-NF, its parent organization (the Popular Forces), and 2 other anti-Hamas militants reportedly thanked Donald Trump for the Gaza peace plan and ceasefire.

=== Clashes with Hamas ===
After the 10 October ceasefire, Hamas allegedly redeployed members in Jabalia and the refugee camp, where they supposedly launched a crackdown on PA-NF, allegedly arresting and killing its members. However, this was denied by PA-NF in a video released on 14 October. It was reported that clashes between Gazan Security Forces and PA-NF had taken place in Jabalia and Beit Lahia.

== Territorial control and structure ==
The PA-NF is headquartered in the Ezbet Beit Hanoun Elementary School in Northern Gaza. It led by Ashraf al-Mansi, a resident of Gaza City and is made up of around 40 fighters. The militia is primarily made up of former drug dealers/traffickers, with its leader Ashraf al-Mansi having a criminal background.

On 14 October 2025, Ashraf Al-Mansi, the group's leader, released a video where he denied the alleged Hamas crackdown. Al-Mansi also proclaimed that PA-NF controls several areas in northern Gaza, and warned Hamas from entering their territory. Its flag featuring the logo of PA-NF, is displayed on its vehicles and facilities within its territory.

The militias also maintains ties with the IDF. Unlike the self-proclaimed "un-ideological" parent organization the Popular Forces, some sources have accused the PA-NF of being Islamist. One prominent PA-NF lieutenant, Abu Anas Zeidan, is a former Salafi jihadist who was part of the Islamic State before joining al-Mansi's group.

== See also ==
- Project New Gaza
