= Ibrahim al-Arjani =

Egyptian businessman (born 1977)

- ابراهيم العرجاني
- Born: December 7, 1977 (age 48); Sheikh Zuweid, Sinai Peninsula, Egypt
- Occupations: Businessman and tribal leader
- Notable work: Founder and CEO of Al Organi Group, Hala for Consulting and Tourism and the Leader of Tarabin Bedouin tribe in Egypt and the union of Sinai tribes
- Children: Bergo, Essam Al-Arjani
- Parents: Gomaa Al-Arjani (father); Sabeha Al Shaer (mother)
- Family: Tarabin Bedouin

Ibrahim al-Arjani (also Al-Organi) (Arabic: ابراهيم العرجاني; born December 1977) is an Egyptian businessman.

== Early life ==
Ibrahim al-Arjani was born in Sheikh Zuweid in the northern Sinai Peninsula in Egypt. He is a member of the Tarabin Bedouin tribe. His father is Gomaa Al-Arjani, a former head of the tribe and his mother is Sabeha Al Shaer, a Palestinian from Khan Yunis, Gaza.

He grew up in Sheikh Zuweid, where he went to high school and obtained a diploma in commerce. He worked as a taxi driver before founding his first company in 2010 under the name "Sons of Sinai", then expanding his business to contracting, development, and investment.

== Business career ==
In 2021, he founded Hala Consulting and Tourism, a company that handles the move of residents of Gaza Strip to Egypt and helps resettle them. Al-Arjani owns a number of tourism, vehicle and food companies. He is a member of the Sinai Development Foundation. Prior to the war in Gaza, he was appointed head of a neighborhood renewal project in the Gaza Strip that has since been put on hold.

Al-Arjani has been dubbed "King of the Crossing," reflecting his influential position at the crossing at Rafah.

Al-Arjani is head of the Arab Tribes Union, which represents Egyptian Bedouins living in Sinai. According to Al-Arjani, the Arab Tribes Union was "created out of a sense of national responsibility and reflects the growing role of Sinai’s Arab tribes in preserving the national security of Egypt’s borders."

Al-Arjani is the financier of a new city in northern Sinai which was supposed to be called Ajra. In a last-minute decision, the name was changed to al-Sisi City. The city was built to accommodate 900 families, including 3,500 disabled men, widows and orphans.

On January 19, 2023, Al Ahly SC announced the signing of a contract with Al-Arjani as their new sponsor, his company's logo was present on the club’s shirt during the 2023 FIFA Club World Cup.

== War against terrorism ==
Al-Arjani came into prominence during the Sinai insurgency when he helped form a coalition of pro government tribal force to fight terrorist groups, 30 tribes banded together under his leadership to side with the Egyptian military against ISIS, his cousin Salim lafy was killed in an ISIS attack, he had a personal friendship with Ahmed Mansi a commander of Egypt's El-Sa'ka Forces "Thunderbolt Battalion" who was killed in 2017 Rafah terror attack

== Controversies ==
During Gaza war reports accuse Al-Arjani and his associates of becoming akin to "gatekeepers," allowing or denying passage of refugees from Gaza Strip into Egypt through Rafah border crossing requesting a large sum of money for passage

On 14 May 2025, a gang of baltagiya wearing Bedouin clothes attacked multi-national activists in Ismailia who went there in support of the somoud convoy attempt to reach Rafah border crossing to break the Blockade of the Gaza Strip, some reports accused Al-Arjani of being behind this attack although no definite proof was presented
