= Zeita =

Zeita, Zayta or Zita (Arabic: زيتة or زيتا) may refer to:

== Armenia ==
- Zedea, an Armenian village, formerly known as Zeita or Zeyta, in the Vayots Dzor Province of Armenia

== Lebanon ==
- Zeita, Lebanon, a village in South Lebanon

== Palestine ==
- Raml Zayta, a Palestinian village in the Tulkarm District depopulated in 1948
- Zayta, Hebron, a Palestinian village in the Hebron District depopulated in 1948
- Zeita Jamma'in, a Palestinian village in the Nablus Governorate of the West Bank
- Zeita, Tulkarm, a Palestinian village in the Tulkarm Governorate of the West Bank

== Syria ==
- Zita al-Gharbiyah, a Syrian village inhabited by Lebanese in the Homs Governorate
- Kafr Zita, a Syrian town in the Hama Governorate

== Turkey ==
- Zeita (Anatolia), a town of ancient Anatolia

== See also ==
- Zeta, the sixth letter of the Greek alphabet
