= Zeitun Resistance =

The Zeitun Resistance by the Armenian militia against the Ottoman Empire may refer to:

- First Zeitun Resistance of 1862
- Zeitun Rebellion in 1895–1896
- Second Zeitun Resistance. 1915
