= 2009 Hamas political violence in Gaza =

2009 internal violence in Gaza

Hamas Political Violence in Gaza
- Part of the Gaza War (2008–2009), the Fatah–Hamas conflict and the Palestinian internal political violence
- Map of the Gaza Strip
Date	January 21 – February 2009
Location	Gaza Strip
Result	Hamas executes suspected Israeli collaborators and Fatah members

Belligerents
Hamas	Fatah

Casualties and losses
- 35-80 Palestinians killed; 75 injured, 3 blinded including 19 members of Fatah

The 2009 Hamas political violence took place in the Gaza Strip during and after the 2008–2009 Gaza War. A series of violent acts, ranging from physical assaults, torture, and executions of Palestinians suspected of collaboration with the Israel Defense Forces, as well as members of the Fatah political party, occurred. According to Human Rights Watch, at least 32 people were killed by these attacks: 18 during the conflict and 14 afterward, and several dozen more were maimed, many by shots to the legs.

== Suspected collaborators ==
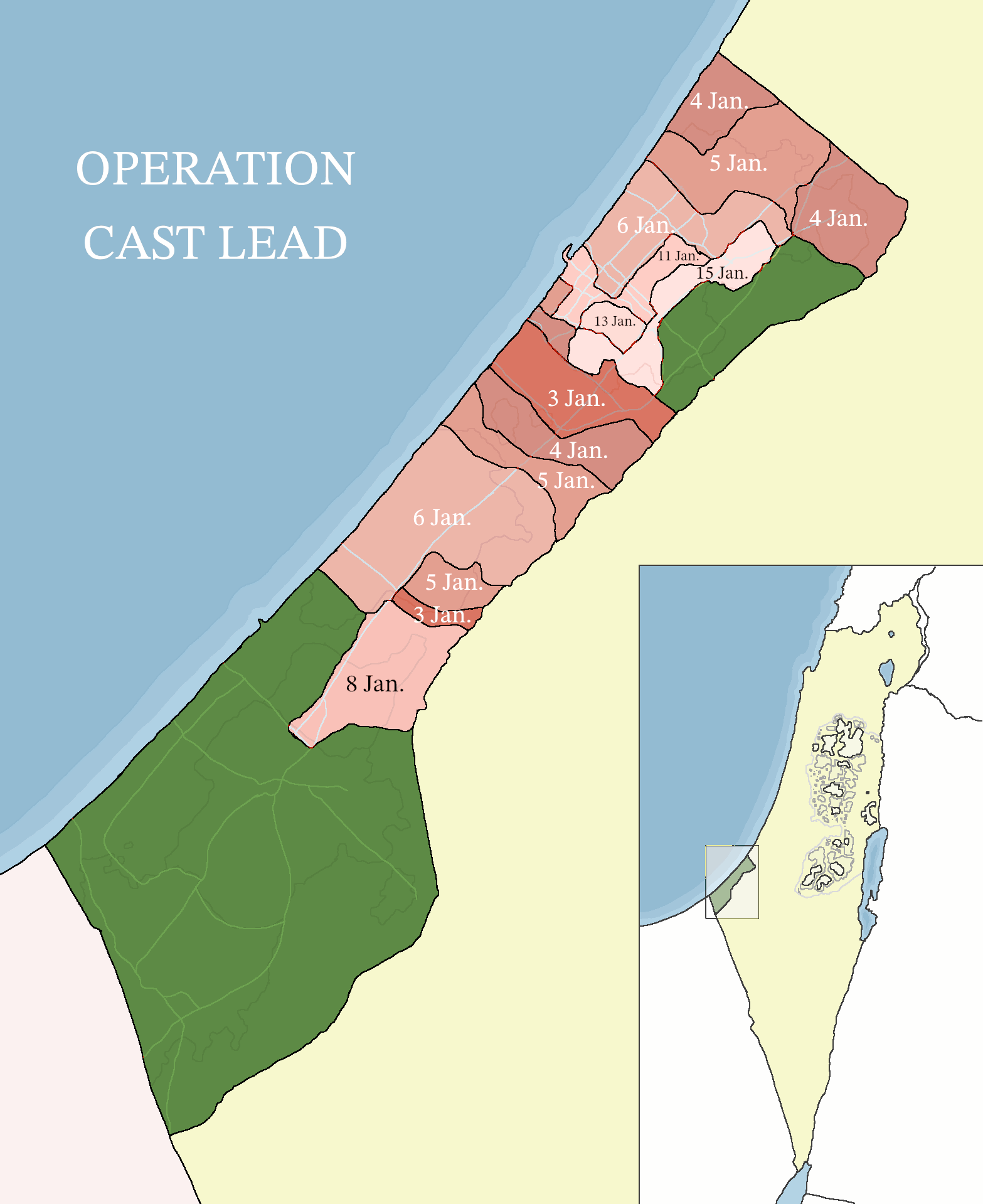
Map of the Gaza War in 2009

Many of the attacks were against people suspected of being informants during the war. Hamas has denied its connection to these attacks, although it admitted that it had been making related arrests in an attempt to re-assert its authority over Gaza. According to a Hamas spokesperson, "The internal security service was instructed to track collaborators and hit them hard. They arrested dozens of collaborators who attempted to strike at Hamas by giving information to Israel about the fighters."

Another Hamas official said, "Maybe some of them were killed because they were acting against the population, against the resistance." A report in the Qatar-based newspaper Al-Sharq quoted Moussa Abu Marzuk, a high-ranking Hamas official, as confirming that the organisation had killed known collaborators.

Ha'aretz, an Israeli newspaper, reported on January 30 that a number of Palestinian spies working in Gaza for Israel had been "intercepted" by Hamas. The information these agents fed to the Israeli military was said to have been used "carelessly", and this may have led to their exposure and subsequent executions.

A human rights group based in Ramallah decried the attacks, releasing a statement that read, "A number of citizens have been extra-judicially executed during and after the Israeli military aggression on the Gaza Strip... Fire was opened on affected citizens at a close distance. In addition, individuals in official uniform or masked persons opened fire on people's legs, severely beat others, imposed house arrests, and threatened to punish citizens along with their families if they would not comply."

Haidar Ghanem, a Palestinian journalist who was a former employee for the Israeli human rights organization B'Tselem, was accused of "collaborating with Israel" during Operation Cast Lead and was executed by Hamas on January 7, Palestinians in the Gaza Strip. According to The Jerusalem Post, "the PA state security court had sentenced Ghanem, a father of two, after holding only two brief sessions."

== Fatah ==
After Hamas won a majority of legislative seats during the 2006 Palestinian elections, tensions between Hamas and Fatah became increasingly violent. In 2007, both parties engaged in a military conflict, in which Hamas won control over the Gaza Strip and forced Fatah into the West Bank. Since the 23-day Israeli assault on Gaza, Hamas has accused Abbas of backing Israel, calling him a traitor and collaborator.

Fatah said 19 of its officials were executed and many more tortured. Gaza residents say Hamas used schools and other public buildings in Gaza City, and the towns of Khan Yunis and Rafah, as detention centers to interrogate members of Fatah. They said three men have been blinded during questioning and over 60 of them shot in the legs as punishment. The Palestinian Center for Human Rights stated that "Hamas operatives killed six members of Fatah" and that "[another] 35 were shot in the knees or beaten.

Reuters reported that Hamas leadership in Gaza "denied the allegations [from Fatah] but said [Hamas] authorities had begun tracking down suspected 'collaborators' with Israel."

== Dissenters ==
Testimonies from Gaza civilians documented in the course of Gaza War imply that people do not dare to speak out openly against Hamas; those who tried to object were shot by Hamas operatives.

== See also ==
- Timeline of the Gaza War (2008–2009)
- 2007 Battle of Gaza
- Human rights in the Gaza Strip
- Palestinian political violence
