= Popular Forces =

Palestinian anti-Hamas militia

Popular Forces القوات الشعبية al-Quwwāt ash-Shaʿbiyya
- The emblem of the Popular Forces
- Leader: Ghassan Duhine (Note: The Leader of the Popular Forces also leads the Administration since 6 May 2025)
- Spokesman: Abu Awad
- Founder: Yasser Abu Shabab
- Founded: November 2023; 3 years ago (as the Abu Shabab militia)
- Headquarters: Al-Bayuk, Rafah
- Armed Wing: Counter-Terrorism Service (de facto from 2024, but officially 2025–present)
- Membership: 500–700 (estimate as of October 2025)
- Ideology: Self-proclaimed: Anti-Hamas; Palestinian nationalism; Non-ideological; Elements: Salafi jihadism (alleged)
- National affiliation: (Palestine) Popular Forces administration in the Gaza Strip
- Subgroups: Popular Army – Northern Forces; Popular Army in Rafah (Free Homeland Forces); Popular Defense Forces – Khalil al-Wazir Battalion
- Battles and Wars: Gaza–Israel conflict; Gaza war; Rafah offensive; Battle of Khan Yunis (2025); Anti-Hamas insurgency in Gaza; 2025 Hamas executions; Killing of Yasser Abu Shabab; 2025 Hamas–Doghmush conflict; Israeli attacks on the Maghazi refugee camp
- Designated as terror group by: (Palestine) Hamas Government of the Gaza Strip

Flag

Website
- https://www.facebook.com/popularforces1

The Popular Forces, (Note: Arabic: القوات الشعبية, romanized: al-Quwwāt ash-Shaʿbiyya.) also known as the Anti-Terror Service, (Note: This group is named by some sources as "Anti-Terror Service" or "Popular Forces or Anti-Terror Service".) is a Palestinian anti-Hamas armed group active in the Gaza Strip which was founded by Yasser Abu Shabab during the Gaza war. Following Yasser Abu Shabab's death on 4 December 2025, Ghassan Duhine proclaimed himself the new leader. The Popular Forces are Israeli-backed and allegedly Islamic State (IS)-linked. (Note: Attributed to multiple sources:) The group, which has been described as a gang or militia, is made up of approximately 500–700 men who operate in eastern Rafah and eastern Khan Yunis. The Popular Army – Northern Forces militia of the northern Gaza Strip, led by Ashraf al-Mansi, also reportedly operates as part of the Popular Forces. Israeli support for the Popular Forces was only revealed in June 2025, but the group has been active since the beginning of the Rafah offensive in May 2024.

The Popular Forces were able to come to power in Rafah during the Gaza war amid the power vacuum left by a weakened Hamas. The Popular Forces controlled territory and aid routes near the Egypt–Gaza border, and were accused of looting humanitarian aid entering the Gaza Strip, described by a United Nations official as "grand larceny". The group maintained that it protects civilians from "the terror of the Hamas government" and denies large-scale looting. In June 2025, the Popular Forces announced that they were helping to protect aid shipments sent to distribution sites run by the Gaza Humanitarian Foundation (GHF), and aid truck drivers told CNN that Abu Shabab had furnished men to protect aid convoys. In the same month, the Popular Forces and the Israel Defense Forces were accused of shooting and killing multiple Gazans seeking aid at a GHF aid site.

Israeli officials acknowledged sending weapons to the Popular Forces, as part of a program of arming and supporting anti-Hamas elements and clans in the Gaza Strip. Abu Shabab acknowledged collaboration with Israel. Hamas, an unnamed Israeli security official, and Israeli opposition politicians such as Avigdor Lieberman, Yair Golan, and Yair Lapid have alleged that the Popular Forces is affiliated with IS, and have lambasted Israeli support of the group. Some of the prominent figures of the Popular Forces were identified as former IS militants who fought in the Sinai insurgency. A member of the European Council on Foreign Relations, Muhammad Shehada, stated that majority of Abu Shabab's group consists of "convicted murderers, thieves, collaborators, drug dealers or members of ISIS [ISIL] in Sinai or in Gaza itself". Abu Shabab denied connections to IS, labelling the allegations as propaganda meant to sow hostility between Arabs and Israelis.

== History ==
=== Origins and characteristics ===
The Popular Forces founded by Yasser Abu Shabab, a local clan leader, gangster, and former drug trafficker convicted and imprisoned by the Hamas government. Abu Shabab was arrested by Hamas in 2015 on drug trafficking charges and sentenced to 25 years in Asda prison, located in Khan Yunis. The group was created after Abu Shabab escaped from the prison as it was bombed by Israel in October 2023. Reportedly, after his escape, Abu Shabab headed to the Kerem Shalom border crossing and assembled a force of a few hundred men, exerting control over the territory near it. Abu Shabab's own tribe, the Tarabin Bedouins, has publicly disavowed Abu Shabab due to his collaboration with Israel, and has also assisted the Egyptian army in fighting against ISIS.

Under its current form and name, the group emerged in Rafah in May 2024 amid Israel's Rafah offensive. According to sources, members of the group belonged to earlier Salafi jihadist factions that opposed Hamas, former Palestinian officers, and known criminals. The group has 300 men, 50 of whom were personally recruited by Abu Shahab, while the other 250 men were allegedly recruited through the Palestinian Authority's intelligence services. The gang took control of much of the Nasr neighborhood in eastern Rafah, which was significantly damaged by bombing from the IDF, as well as aid routes around the Keram Shalom border crossing, including territory 1.5 km from the crossing. The Popular Forces had also expanded into Khan Yunis, north of Rafah.

The Popular Forces are armed with assault rifles and equipped with radios and night-vision goggles. Denying being armed by Israel, Abu Shabab claimed that the Popular Forces were funded by "individual efforts and donations" and that they were armed with "primitive weapons" which were inherited from local tribes. He claimed that his group was a humanitarian effort and that it was allowing families to escape from "war and famine". Abu Shabab stated that his group were grassroots forces and that they were not an official authority, nor were they operating under control of the Palestinian Authority (PA). However, Abu Shabab had stated that his militia operates "under Palestinian legitimacy", ostensibly a reference to the PA. Major General Anwar Rajab, spokesman of the Palestinian Authority security services, told CNN that there were no connections between the PA and the Popular Forces. The Guardian noted that Abu Shabab's statements often appeared contradictory and in contradiction to previous statements or verifiable evidence.

=== Leaders and commanders ===
Name	Role	Status	references
Yasser Abu Shabab	Leader, until 4 December 2025	Fugitive, killed on 4 December 2025	
Ghassan Duhine	Commander of the Popular Forces' armed wing the Counter-Terrorism Service, new leader of the Popular Forces after Yasser Abu Shabab's death.	Wounded on 4 December 2025	
Abu Awad	Spokesperson		
Issam Nabahin	Senior commander	Fugitive	
Ashraf al-Mansi	Leader of the Popular Army – Northern Forces		
Ahmad Zidan al-Tarabin	Responsible for recruiting militants	Executed by Hamas	
Hassan Abu Shabab	Commander and relative of Yasser Abu Shabab		
Shawqi Abu Nasira	Leader of the Popular Army in Rafah		
Abu Anas Zeidan	Lieutenant in the Popular Army – Northern Forces		
Khaled Abu Sanida	Chief of staff of the Counter-Terrorism Service		

=== Aid looting ===
In 2024, amid severe food shortages in Gaza, the Popular Forces were widely accused of looting humanitarian aid by truck drivers, Gazan transportation company owners, aid workers, aid groups, and international humanitarian officials. On 16 November 2024, gangsters, including the Popular Forces, looted 109 UN aid trucks, in what NPR stated was the "biggest looting of UN aid anywhere, ever." A truck driver whose truck was ambushed by gang members said that they identified Yasser Abu Shabab as their boss. Another Gazan said that he attempted to buy flour from Abu Shabab's gang and saw the gang's gunmen guarding warehouses containing stolen food from the United Nations, and that the gunmen had threatened him with weapons.

A United Nations official posted in Gaza described these activities as "tactical, systematic, criminal looting" and the work of a "crime syndicate". Sam Rose, deputy director of the United Nations Relief Works Agency (UNRWA), stated that "Law and order have broken down in the area around the Kerem Shalom crossing, which remains the main entry point of goods, and gangs are filling the power vacuum". An aid worker stated that the looting had caused widespread hunger. The Economist reported that Abu Shabab's gang had killed several drivers during the lootings, and that stolen aid was either kept by the gang or sold at inflated prices.

=== Connections to Israel ===
UN officials said that the Israeli military had been instrumental in facilitating the looting. One official said "These guys are probably the only people in Gaza who can get 100 yards from an Israeli tank or Israeli soldiers without being shot". A diplomatic official told CNN that "The fact that [Abu Shabab] is not targeted by the Israelis is a clear indication of how they see him", and alleged that collaboration existed between Abu Shabab and the Gaza Humanitarian Foundation (which the GHF denied, and Abu Shabab declined to comment on). Aid workers and locals stated that armed men were able to loot aid trucks "in plain sight" of the IDF. Jonathan Whittall, head of the United Nations Office for the Coordination of Humanitarian Affairs (OCHA) in the occupied Palestinian territories stated that "theft of aid since the beginning of the war has been carried out by criminal gangs, under the watch of Israeli forces, and they were allowed to operate in proximity to the Kerem Shalom crossing point into Gaza." Whittall later clarified that he was referring to gangs "such as Abu Shabab".

Stéphane Dujarric, spokesperson for the United Nations Secretary General, stated that "The reports – the idea that the Israeli forces may be allowing looters or not doing enough to prevent [looting] is frankly fairly alarming, given the responsibilities of Israel as the occupying power to ensure that humanitarian aid is distributed safely". According to analysts, it is likely that Abu Shabab communicates with Israeli forces, "based on evidence of his movements in Israeli-controlled areas of Gaza", and his proximity to Israeli military positions. According to The Guardian, videos posted on Abu Shabab's Facebook account show his men operating with Israeli soldiers.

In June 2025, Avigdor Lieberman, leader of the Yisrael Beytenu party, alleged that Israel secretly supplies weapons to crime families in Gaza to make Hamas weaker. Prime Minister of Israel Benjamin Netanyahu admitted that Israel is arming anti-Hamas clans and elements in Gaza against Hamas. He stated, "On the advice of security officials, we activated clans in Gaza that oppose Hamas. What's wrong with that? It's only good. It only saves the lives of IDF soldiers". Associated Press confirmed that one of the groups sponsored by Israel is the Popular Forces. Reportedly, Israel has supplied Abu Shabab's group with Kalashnikov rifles, some stolen from Hamas militants. The operation was approved by Netanyahu himself. Speaking to The New York Times, retired Brigadier General Shlomo Brom stated that in backing the Popular Forces, Israel is looking for "other solutions" to post-war governance of the Gaza Strip, besides Israel or the Palestinian Authority. However, The Economist disputed that Israel is tapping the Popular Forces as a post-war ruler of Gaza. Israeli support for the Popular Forces has caused controversy among Israeli opposition leaders.

According to the Israeli newspaper Maariv, Shin Bet was allegedly responsible for the creation of the Popular Forces. Reportedly, chief of Shin Bet Ronen Bar proposed the group as an alternative to Hamas in small areas of Gaza during his talks with Benjamin Netanyahu. A security official told Ynet that Shin Bet armed the Popular Forces in a "planned and managed" manner, with the goal of "reducing Israeli military casualties while systematically undermining Hamas through targeted strikes, infrastructure destruction and the promotion of rival local forces".

In a statement, the family of Abu Shabab stated that they "were surprised by video footage broadcast by the resistance showing the involvement of Yasser's groups within a dangerous security framework, reaching the point of operating within undercover units and supporting the Zionist occupation forces, who are brutally killing our people". The family announced its "complete disassociation" with Abu Shabab, and that it held no objections to Abu Shabab being "eliminated". Abu Shabab responded to their statements, saying that they were "fabricated and false" and that they are a part of a "media campaign" targeting him and his "colleagues". Hamas stated that Abu Shabab is "a tool used by the Israeli occupation to fragment the Palestinian internal front", and pledged to oppose him. Abu Shabab acknowledged collaboration with Israel.

In May and June 2025, in what The New York Times and NPR described as a rebranding, Abu Shabab announced that his group was securing aid into the Gaza Strip, protecting routes to US and Israeli aid sites administered by the Gaza Humanitarian Foundation. Despite this, spokesperson of GHF said that the organization had "no collaboration" with Abu Shabab. He said that all GHF workers were unarmed and none belong to Abu Shabab's group. In an interview with CNN, truck drivers said that Abu Shabab provided 200 armed men to protect their convoys. In social media posts, Abu Shabab claimed responsibility for safeguarding aid trucks, and organizing and directing aid convoys. UN humanitarian agency OCHA stated that "it did not pay anyone" to guard aid trucks entering Gaza. In June 2025, Abu Shabab released videos calling on citizens of Rafah to return, promising them food, shelter, and protection in makeshift camps which were built under the watch of IDF.

On 6 July 2025, Abu Shabab, in an interview with Radio Makan, stated that the Popular Forces will continue to fight Hamas even if a ceasefire is archived. The interview was conducted hours after the Palestinian Joint Operations Room said that his blood was "permitted", calling for his assassination. Abu Shabab said that Hamas is in the "final stages" before its elimination and that its "fighting its last battles". He also said that Popular Forces are able to "operate freely" in areas under Israeli control and indicated "coordination" with IDF. Abu Shabab said that the Popular Forces would rule the Gaza Strip after Hamas was overthrown, and that his group was not in conflict with the Palestinian Authority. Abu Shabab also said that October 7 attacks were a "crime" and that they caused the "Palestinian suffering".

=== Allegations of connections to the Islamic State ===
Popular Forces have been accused of having connections to the Islamic State by Israeli politicians, Hamas members, and Western observers.

Israeli support for the Popular Forces has caused controversy among Israeli opposition politicians and leaders, some whom have described the move as "complete madness", due to the Popular Forces' alleged connections with IS. Former defense minister and Netanyahu rival Avigdor Libermann said, "We're talking about the equivalent of ISIS in Gaza" and that "No one can guarantee that these weapons will not be directed towards Israel". The Guardian noted that the basis of Avigdor Libermann's assertions of the Popular Forces' ties to IS were not clear. Yesh Atid party member and Leader of the Opposition Yair Lapid declared on social media, "After Netanyahu finished handing over millions of dollars to Hamas, he moved on to supplying weapons to groups in Gaza affiliated with ISIS – all improvised, with no strategic planning, and all leading to more disasters." Yair Golan of The Democrats party said that Netanyahu "is creating a new ticking bomb in Gaza".

Hamas Political Bureau member and spokesman Basem Naim told Newsweek that the Popular Forces has connections to ISIS, and that it is a group of "agents, drug dealers, thieves, and extremists linked to IS". The European Council on Foreign Relations think tank stated that Abu Shabab's clan, from which most Popular Forces fighters are drawn from, is connected to IS. One of the group's commanders was reported to be 33-year-old Issam Nabahin, who previously fought on the side of IS during the Sinai insurgency. Reportedly, he was sentenced to death for his crimes in 2023 but managed to escape the prison before his execution. Another prominent group member, Ghassan Duhine, allegedly pledged allegiance to IS in 2015 and participated in the 2007 kidnapping of BBC News journalist Alan Johnston. An unnamed Israeli security official told The i Paper that the group had close ties to "ISIS affiliates across the border in Egypt". Accusations of links to IS stem from Abu Shabab's cooperation with Egyptian Jihadist groups in smuggling drugs from Egypt into the Gaza Strip.

In June 2025, Abu Shabab gave an interview to the Israeli Army Radio in which he denied has denied having any connections to both ISIS and Israel. There is no evidence that Abu Shabab has formally sworn allegiance to ISIS.

Several high-ranking members of the Popular Forces had previously worked together with or joined the Islamic State. These include Issam Nabahin and Ghassan Duhine, who were members of IS' Sinai Province and the IS-affiliated Army of Islam, respectively. One prominent Popular Army – Northern Forces lieutenant, Abu Anas Zeidan, is reportedly a former Salafi jihadist who was part of the Islamic State before joining al-Mansi's group.

Aymenn Jawad Al-Tamimi, writing for Middle East Forum, disputed the allegations that the Popular Forces is linked to IS. He argues that the group's use of the Palestinian flag in their logo and uniforms would be unacceptable to the pan-islamist IS, even as a disguise, and that collaboration with Israel would constitute apostasy from Islam from IS perspective. While al-Tamini concedes that some members of the group may have a Salafi background, he states this is far removed from the notion of an IS-Israeli collaboration against Hamas.

=== Allegations of connections to the United Arab Emirates ===
In October 2025, Sky News reported that the Popular Forces had been smuggling vehicles from an Israeli bedouin car dealer who smuggles vehicles into the Gaza Strip. Senior commander of Popular Forces Ghassan Duhine has been photographed next to a white Isuzu with a "UAE" written on the edge of a license plate. According to Sky News, the logo and name of the Popular Forces' military wing, the Counter-Terrorism Service, is identical to a similar group called the Counter-Terrorism Service in Yemen that has allegedly received Emirati support. In response, the Emirati government stated "The United Arab Emirates categorically rejects and refutes these baseless allegations" and "These claims are entirely unfounded and misrepresent the UAE's policies and actions."

== Allied groups ==
=== Counter Terrorism Service ===
The Counter Terrorism Service (Arabic: جهاز مكافحة الإرهاب, romanized: Jihaz Mukafahat Al-Irhab) is the armed wing of the Popular Forces. Its leader is Khaled Abu Sanida

Ghassan served as the first official military commander of the Counter-Terrorism Service, and formerly a senior commander to Yasser Abu Shabab. He comes from the Tarabin clan based in the Rafah area. Duhine previously held roles in the Palestinian National Security Forces prior to the 2007 Battle of Gaza, and has been described by media outlets as a former fighter within the Army of Islam, a Gaza-based Salafi jihadist militant group aligned with the Islamic State (IS). He was allegedly jailed in the past for criminal offences including drug trafficking.

According to sources, members of the group belonged to earlier Salafi jihadist factions that opposed Hamas, former Palestinian officers, and known criminals. As of March 2025, the group has 300 men, 50 of whom were personally recruited by Abu Shahab, while the other 250 men were allegedly recruited through the Palestinian Authority’s intelligence services.

==== Conflict with Hamas ====
Due to being the Popular Forces' armed wing, official military wing/force and armed forces, the Counter Terrorism Service has been at the forefront of the Popular Forces' clashes with Hamas. On 7 December, Ghassan Duhine announced the execution of two of Hamas' members, claiming they had killed a Popular Forces member. The Counter-Terrorism Service announced a military exercise called “Ensuring the Commander-1” (Ahd al-Qa’ed-1). The exercise lasted three days and aimed to test the CTS' readiness in emergency situations and review coordination among its ranks. The newly-appointed Chief of Staff of the Counter Terrorism Service, Khalid Abu Sneida, was also present during the exercise. During the exercise, the Popular Forces' leader, Ghassan Duhine, revealed the existence of another militia operating in western Rafah, known as the Popular Defense Forces – Khalil al-Wazir Battalion.

On 7 January 2026, the Popular Forces reported that its armed wing (the Counter Terrorism Service) killed two Hamas operatives during an operation in Rafah in southern Gaza. The group stated that the two men were killed after refusing to surrender, and that a third individual was detained during the same raid. The incident was reported amid broader coverage of armed activity involving Israel-aligned local groups in Gaza, separate from direct Israeli military operations.

==== Khalil al-Wazir Battalion ====
On 20 December 2025, the Counter-Terrorism Service announced a military exercise called "Ensuring the Commander-1" which was aimed to test the CTS' readiness in emergency situations and review coordination among its ranks. During the exercise, the Popular Forces' leader, Ghassan Duhine, revealed the existence of another militia operating in western Rafah, known as the Popular Defense Forces – Khalil al-Wazir Battalion. The headquarters of the Martyr Khalil al-Wazir Battalion is located at Al-Quds Open University in Tel al-Sultan, Rafah.

==== Equipment ====
The Counter Terrorism Service are armed with assault rifles and equipped with radios and night-vision goggles. Denying being armed by Israel, Abu Shabab claimed that the Popular Forces were funded by "individual efforts and donations" and that they were armed with "primitive weapons" which were inherited from local tribes.

==== Alleged connections to the UAE ====
According to Sky News, the logo and name of the Popular Forces' military wing, the Counter Terrorism Service, is identical to a similar group called the Counter Terrorism Service in Yemen that has allegedly received Emirati support. In response, the UAE government stated "The United Arab Emirates categorically rejects and refutes these baseless allegations" and "These claims are entirely unfounded and misrepresent the UAE's policies and actions."

=== Ashraf al-Mansi group ===
A northern Gaza militia, which has been referred to by the names "The People's Army – Forces of Northern Gaza" or "People's Army Northern Forces" is reportedly operating in Beit Lahia and Jabalia as part of the Popular Forces. The militia is led by the Gaza City resident Ashraf al-Mansi. Following the 10 October ceasefire, Hamas forces redeployed in Jabalia and its refugee camp, where they reportedly launched a crackdown on the al-Mansi group, arresting and killing its members. However, on 14 October, al-Mansi released a video where he denied that a Hamas crackdown had taken place, announced that his group managed to take control of several areas in northern Gaza, and warned Hamas forces against approaching their territories.

=== Free Homeland Forces ===
Shawqi Abu Nasira, a former Palestinian Authority lieutenant colonel and Fatah member, leads an anti-Hamas militia based in eastern Khan Yunis. While the existence of the group was only revealed in late November 2025, it had reportedly already been active for several months. Abu Nasira has stated that his group is not collaborating with Israel, and has stated that Iran, which supports Hamas, is the enemy "of Islam and Sunnis". The rest of the Abu Nasira family has disavowed him. During the 1980s, Abu Nasira was reportedly imprisoned by Israel for militant activity, and briefly escaped from prison. Following his release and the implementation of the Oslo Accords, he joined the nascent Palestinian Authority security forces. Abu Nasira's son was reportedly killed during the Gaza war due to his opposition to Hamas.

In April 2026, the Free Homeland Forces raided the Maghazi refugee camp near Deir al-Balah in Gaza searching for Hamas fighters while the Israeli military provided air support. The militia killed at least ten people and wounded many more.

== Combat operations and clashes with Hamas ==
The Popular Forces began clashing with Hamas in May 2024, during the Rafah offensive. This was followed by a string of armed operations and clashes which included the Kerem Shalom aid convoy looting of November 2024 and the 2025 Gaza Strip aid distribution killings. Hamas attacks against the Popular Forces include a retaliatory raid against the Kerem Shalom looters in November 2024, the brief capture of Issam Nabahin in June 2025, and an assault on a GHF bus allegedly transporting Popular Forces militants that same month. Hamas has also carried out executions of multiple Popular Forces members.

On 7 January 2026, the Popular Forces reported that it killed two Hamas operatives during an operation in Rafah in southern Gaza. The group stated that the two men were killed after refusing to surrender, and that a third individual was detained during the same raid. The incident was reported amid broader coverage of armed activity involving Israel-aligned local groups in Gaza, separate from direct Israeli military operations.

== Administration within the Gaza Strip ==
The Popular Forces, along with the Counter-Terrorism Strike Force, have administered parts of the Gaza Strip occupied by the IDF where 2,000 Palestinian civilians live in. This is the first time since 2007 where parties other than Hamas has taken over the role of governing.

== See also ==
- Counter-Terrorism Strike Force
- Wartime collaboration
- Collaboration with the Islamic State
- Islamist anti-Hamas groups in the Gaza Strip
- Israel and state-sponsored terrorism
- Israeli support for Hamas, has been likened to Israeli support for the Popular Forces
- Criticism of Hamas
- Salafi jihadist insurgency in the Gaza Strip
- Project New Gaza
