= Palestinian internal political violence =

Palestinian internal political violence has existed throughout the course of the Israeli–Palestinian conflict, notwithstanding the fact that the vast majority of Palestinian political violence has been directed against Israeli targets. Some analysts have referred to this type of violence as an "intrafada", a portmanteau of "intra" and "intifada".

== In British Palestine ==
From 1936 to 1939, the Palestinian Arabs revolted against the British rule of Palestine and against the British-backed Zionist movement.

Amin al-Husseini, head of the Arab Higher Committee, came into conflict with the more moderate Nashishibi family, which supported the partition of Palestine into two states, Jewish and Palestinian Arab. This rift produced significant violence, including the abductions of British-backed local village chiefs and the assassinations of suspected collaborators. Despite shared adherence to the Palestinian cause by both local Muslims and Christians, there were cases of Muslim radicals coordinating attacks against Christians, as well as against local Druze. Overall, 10% of Palestinian deaths during the revolt were from intra-Palestinian violence.

== Lebanese Civil War ==
As a result of the 1948 Palestine war and the beginning of the Nakba, various Palestinian refugee camps were established in Lebanon, and decades later Palestinian factions played a major role in the Lebanese Civil War (1975–1990).

There were multiple pro-Syrian Palestinian factions in Lebanon during the war, namely the PFLP, PFLP-GC, as-Sa'iqa, the Palestinian Popular Struggle Front, the Talat Yaqub wing of the Palestinian Liberation Front, and Fatah al-Intifada. Being Syrian proxies, these factions and others had fought against the Palestine Liberation Organization (PLO) in engagements such as the 1983 Battle of Tripoli, as a result of antagonistic relations between the PLO chairman Yasser Arafat and the Syrian president Hafez al-Assad.

In 1985, the pro-Syrian factions formed the Palestinian National Salvation Front (PNSF), based in Mar Elias, a Palestinian Christian refugee camp. The PNSF joined the Amal Movement in fighting the PLO in the Palestinian refugee camps of southern Lebanon and west Beirut, in what was called the "War of the Camps" subconflict.

The fighting in west Beirut ended in April 1987 with the arrival of Syrian forces to the area; in the south, the fighting ended in a stalemate. Ultimately, the Lebanese government estimates that some 2500 Palestinians, both combatants and non-combatants, were killed during the War of the Camps, but the real number is likely higher.

== First Intifada ==
About one-fifth of the 730 attacks during the first four months of the First Intifada were the result of intra-Palestinian political violence. What has been described as a wave of "paranoia" swept the occupied Palestinian territories, leading to the mass killings of suspected collaborators with Israel.

By June 1990, according to Benny Morris, "[T]he Intifada seemed to have lost direction. A symptom of the PLO's frustration was the great increase in the killing of suspected collaborators." Roughly 18,000 Palestinians, compromised by Israeli intelligence, are said to have given information to the other side. Collaborators were threatened with death or ostracism unless they desisted, and if their collaboration with the occupying power continued, were executed by special troops such as the "Black Panthers" and "Red Eagles". An estimated 771 (according to the Associated Press) to 942 (according to the IDF) Palestinians were executed on suspicion of collaboration during the span of the Intifada.

As a result of the Oslo Accords between the PLO and Israel, the Palestinian Authority (PA) was formed in 1994, as a compromise, to exercise limited governance in the Palestinian territories. After the Oslo Accords, and with the failure to establish an actual independent Palestinian state, "strong feelings of betrayal and futility" arose among many Palestinians.

== Second Intifada ==
The Second Intifada involved direct fighting between the forces of Israel and those of the PA.

A January 2003 Humanist magazine article reported:

For over a decade the PA has violated Palestinian human rights and civil liberties by routinely killing civilians—including collaborators, demonstrators, journalists, and others—without charge or fair trial. Of the total number of Palestinian civilians killed during this period by both Israeli and Palestinian security forces, 16 percent were the victims of Palestinian security forces.

... According to Freedom House's annual survey of political rights and civil liberties, Freedom in the World 2001–2002, the chaotic nature of the Intifada along with strong Israeli reprisals has resulted in a deterioration of living conditions for Palestinians in Israeli-administered areas. The survey states:

"Civil liberties declined due to: shooting deaths of Palestinian civilians by Palestinian security personnel; the summary trial and executions of alleged collaborators by the Palestinian Authority (PA); extrajudicial killings of suspected collaborators by militias; and the apparent official encouragement of Palestinian youth to confront Israeli soldiers, thus placing them directly in harm's way."

== Fatah–Hamas conflict ==
The Fatah–Hamas conflict involves two Palestinian political parties– Fatah, which runs the PA, and Hamas, an Islamist faction. The conflict originated in tensions surrounding the 2006 Palestinian legislative election and culminated in the 2007 Battle of Gaza, which saw Hamas take over the Gaza Strip. Since then, a Hamas administration has controlled the Gaza Strip, while the Palestinian Authority retains control over the Palestinian enclaves in the West Bank.

The Hamas victory in the election on 25 January 2006 was followed by the formation of a new PA government by leader Ismail Haniyeh. This government suffered from political paralysis, due to lack of cooperation from Fatah, and from severe diplomatic isolation due to Hamas' refusal to commit to nonviolence and recognize Israel. Several instances of clashes and assassinations of leaders from both sides exacerbated the tense situation. By October 2006, the United States, Israel, many Arab governments, and most of Abbas's key advisors held the view that Hamas had to be forced out of power if it did not change its positions. Following the Saudi-brokered Fatah–Hamas Mecca agreement, the Hamas government was briefly replaced by a unity government in March 2007 in an effort to end the crippling diplomatic isolation.

Armed clashes between the two sides became increasingly frequent; finally, in June 2007, Hamas wrestled control of the Gaza Strip from Fatah in a 5-day battle and the government split. There were allegations that Fatah was preparing a coup to oust Hamas, and that the Hamas actions were preemptive. The Hamas takeover of the Gaza Strip resulted in Abbas' dissolution of the unity government and the replacement of the PA in the territory with Hamas rule by 15 June. Hamas was unable to seize power in the West Bank, however, as the Al-Aqsa Martyrs' Brigades– at that time the official Fatah armed wing– stormed the parliamentary building in Ramallah.

In early 2009, there was a wave of political violence perpetuated by the Hamas administration in the Gaza Strip. A series of violent acts, ranging from physical assaults, torture, and executions of Palestinians suspected of collaboration with the Israel Defense Forces, as well as members of the Fatah political party, occurred. According to Human Rights Watch, at least 32 people were killed by these attacks: 18 during the conflict and 14 afterward, and several dozen more were maimed, many by shots to the legs.

In May 2009, Hamas militants clashed with PA security forces in Qalqilya, West Bank. In 2014, the Shin Bet revealed an alleged plot by Hamas to depose Fatah in the West Bank. This would be achieved by deploying Hamas cells around the West Bank to incite a third intifada and overwhelm Palestinian Authority forces. More than 90 people were arrested. President Abbas said the plot was "a grave threat to the unity of the Palestinian people and its future."

During the 2023–present Gaza war, Hamas accused Fatah of sending security officers into northern Gaza in collaboration with Israel, saying it had arrested six individuals and were "in pursuit" of the others. The Palestinian Authority issued a statement refuting the claims by Hamas. In July 2025, two Israeli-backed Fatah-affiliated clans, the Hilles clan and Khanidak clan, began operating against Hamas in Shuja'iyya and Khan Yunis, respectively.

== Salafi jihadist insurgency in the Gaza Strip ==
Beginning in 2007, a number of Salafi jihadist groups in the Gaza Strip began clashing with Hamas and carrying out attacks against various civilian targets throughout the territory.

At one point in 2009, the group Jund Ansar Allah launched a brief revolt against Hamas in Rafah, proclaiming the establishment of an "Islamic Emirate of Rafah", which was suppressed by Hamas.

Many anti-Hamas Salafi jihadist groups in Gaza also participated in the related Sinai insurgency in Egypt.

The newest incarnation of the insurgency may be occurring during the Gaza war (2023–present) with the Israeli-backed Popular Forces, allegedly affiliated with the Islamic State, fighting a conflict with Hamas.

== Abbas–Dahlan conflict ==
The rivalry between Abbas and Mohammad Dahlan also sparked incidents of inter-Palestinian violence in the West Bank in the late 2010s and early 2020s, particularly in the Balata refugee camp in Nablus and in the Jenin refugee camp, where Dahlan allegedly had strong support from militants. Dahlan is an ex-Fatah politician and former Palestinian security head now based in the United Arab Emirates, and is regarded by some Palestinians as a leading candidate to potentially replace Abbas. The Fatah politician Dimitri Diliani argued that such violence was more so based in local disillusionment with the PA rather than an actual plot against Abbas directed by Dahlan.

On 23 August 2016, PA security forces arrested Ahmed Halawa and beat him to death. Halawa had associates that were "deemed close" to Dahlan by the PA. Foreign Affairs reported:

The specter of Halawa, a local Fatah leader, amassing weapons just as international pressure was building for Abbas to allow Dahlan’s return [to the West Bank] may go a long way toward explaining the lethality of what eventually transpired in Nablus. Whether based in fact or a flight of fancy, someone in the PA may truly have believed that a political threat was forming in the Old City [of Nablus].

In 2017, Hatem Abu Rizek, a senior commander of the Al-Aqsa Martyrs' Brigades affiliated with Dahlan, and six other militants turned themselves in to Palestinian Authority security forces, "who accused them of imposing a reign of terror and intimidation on Palestinians in the Nablus area."

In 2018, Rizek and three other senior militants were arrested on suspicion of receiving funding from Dahlan. One of those senior militants, Ahmed Abu Hamaddah, was later shot and killed during a clash with PA forces.

In late October 2020, Israeli media reported on Dahlan loyalists arming themselves in the Balata camp and in refugee camps in Jenin. Later that month, Dahlan loyalists clashed with PA forces in the al-Ama'ri refugee camp near Ramallah. On 31 October, Abbas reportedly ordered a massive security crackdown on the Dahlan loyalists. Abu Rizek was reportedly killed on that same day by Palestinian Authority forces in the Balata camp, and would become a local martyr, with the Balata camp militia "Groups of the Martyr Hatem Abu Rizek" later formed.

On 14 December 2020, likely pro-Dahlan militants clashed with security forces in the Balata camp, injuring four security officers, and later that night the PA headquarters in Jenin was targeted with gunfire.

== Palestinian Authority–West Bank militias conflict ==
In the West Bank, various local Palestinian militias have been engaged in an armed conflict with the PA.

The conflict began with a "proliferation" of armed groups in the West Bank from 2021 to 2022 as a result of the weakness and complicity of the PA in the Israeli occupation as well as several other factors including the 2021 Israel–Palestine crisis.

The PA has had a shared interest with Israel in suppressing militants. Cooperation between the PA security forces and the IDF is reflected by the fact that the former have simply remained in their barracks during IDF raids and have actively interfered with militants' defenses against those raids.

During the 2023–present Gaza war, the rate of clashes has increased. The July 2024 West Bank unrest directed against the Palestinian Authority was a major escalation in the conflict, sparked by the alleged arrest attempt of "Abu Shujaa", the leader of the Tulkarm Brigade, on 26 July. Protestors and militants clashed with security forces in Tulkarm, Jenin, Bethlehem, Tubas, and Nablus. By August, the unrest had been "contained", according to Tulkarm officials.

The PA also launched notable anti-militia operations into Tubas in October 2024 and into Jenin in December 2024.

== Societal breakdown in the Gaza Strip during the Gaza war ==
During the Gaza war, societal and institutional breakdown occurred across the Gaza Strip caused by continual military assaults by the Israel Defense Forces on Palestinian law enforcement institutions as well as widespread starvation, famine, and lack of essential supplies created by the conflict and blockade of the Gaza Strip. Due to significant destabilization caused by military conflict and the ongoing Gaza humanitarian crisis, the United Nations reported in July 2024 that significant increases in looting, killing of law enforcement and humanitarian workers expanded across the Gaza Strip, and were emblematic of greater societal breakdown and spreading "anarchy" throughout the enclave.

According to a report by ACLED, more than 220 intra-Palestinian violent incidents have occurred since October 2023, resulting in the deaths of around 400 Palestinians. Furthermore, the report states that looting of aid, theft, and violent activity by gangs, clans, and armed groups have become widespread, and that 70% of these incidents have occurred after Israel broke the 2025 ceasefire with its attacks in March.

As of 30 September 2025, up to a dozen new armed groups opposed to Hamas have emerged in Gaza. The most prominent of these is the Israeli-backed and allegedly Islamic State-linked Popular Forces, which has become the de facto authority in southeastern Gaza. Other groups include the Counter-Terrorism Strike Force (CSF), which controls the village of Kizan al-Najjar, and several Fatah-affiliated armed clans.

Following the ceasefire in the Gaza Strip on 10 October, Hamas internal security forces began killing and arresting members of rival armed groups throughout the territory. Hamas recalled 7,000 of its security and police forces to reassert control of the Strip.

== See also ==
- Palestinian nationalism
