= Zeita (Anatolia) =

Town of ancient Anatolia

Coordinates: 40°55′59″N 32°47′08″E

Zeita was a town of ancient Anatolia in the borderlands between ancient Bithynia and Paphlagonia, inhabited in Roman times. The name does not occur among ancient authors but is inferred from epigraphic and other evidence.

Its site is located near Meydan, Asiatic Turkey.
