= Zaytoon =

Persian restaurant chain in Dublin, Ireland

Zaytoon is a chain of Persian restaurants, specialising in kebabs, based in Dublin, Ireland. The chain, founded by Iranians, Jamshid Kamvar & Azad Shirazi, and is headquartered in Parliament Street. There are five outlets across the city and county.

The first outlet opened in Parliament Street in 2001.

In October 2019, rumours circulating on social media on the source of the restaurants' ingredients used by the chain were responded to by the chain, stating that the meat was "100% Irish".

== Awards ==
In 2018 and 2024, Deliveroo Ireland named Zaytoon as the "Best Middle Eastern" restaurant in their annual restaurant awards, while a similar honour was given by Just Eat Ireland in 2018.
