= Zeytun, Jahrom =

Zeytun زيتون
- Village
- Location within Iran
- Coordinates: 28°55′30″N 53°14′44″E
- Country: Iran
- Province: Fars
- County: Khafr
- Bakhsh: Central
- Rural District: Gel Berenji

Population (2016)
  - Total: 197
- Time zone: UTC+3:30 (IRST)

Zeytun (Persian: زيتون, also Romanized as Zeytūn) is a village in Gel Berenji Rural District of Khafr County in Fars province, Iran.

At the 2006 census, its population was 212, in 57 families, when it was in Khafr District of Jahrom County. The 2016 census measured the population of the village as 197 people in 62 households.

In 2019, the district was separated from the county in the establishment of Khafr County, and the rural district was transferred to the new Central District.
