= Hilles clan =

Palestinian clan in the Gaza Strip

Hilles clan عشيرة حلس
- Country: Palestine
- Current region: Gaza Strip
- Origin: Shuja'iyya, Gaza City

The Hilles clan (Arabic: عشيرة حلس, romanized: ʻAshīrat Ḥillis), (Note: alternatively transliterated as Helles, Hellis, or sometimes Khalas) is a Fatah-aligned Palestinian clan in the Gaza Strip.

== History ==
=== Early clashes with Hamas ===
The Hilles clan, which is active in the Shuja'iyya neighbourhood of Gaza City, is affiliated with Fatah and has historically been hostile to Hamas. Confrontations between the clan and Hamas occurred after the latter seized control of the Gaza Strip in 2007.

On 17 October 2007, months after Hamas' takeover in Gaza from Fatah, clashes erupted in eastern Gaza between Hamas security forces and members of the Hilles clan, leaving up to two dead on both sides. Fatah and Hamas officials gave conflicting accounts of what caused the fighting but the dispute seems to have originated when Hamas officials demanded that the clan return a governmental car. Another gun battle on 20 October killed one member of the clan and a 13-year-old boy.

Clan members were suspected of carrying out a bombing in Gaza City on 25 July 2008 that killed five Hamas members and a girl. On 2 August, Hamas retaliated against the clan by raiding the Hilles-dominated Shuja'iyya neighborhood of Gaza City; around nine people were killed in the ensuing gunfight, and around 90 were injured. In the evening hours, the leader’s brother of the clan (and former leader of the Tanzim faction of Fatah), Ahmed Hilles, led around 188 members of the clan to Nahal Oz and two other border crossings between Gaza and Israel, where they laid down their weapons and were strip-searched by Israeli troops before being allowed onto Israeli soil; many of the wounded who fled to the border crossing, including Ahmed Hilles, were admitted to hospitals. Four were admitted to Soroka Medical Center in Beersheba for more severe injuries, while eleven others were admitted to Barzilai Medical Center in Ashkelon with lighter injuries.

While in a hospital, Ahmed Hilles stated that Hamas had attacked his clan "because it doesn’t want to see such a big and strong family like mine." Furthermore, he hinted that the Hilles clan would retaliate against Hamas.

Israeli authorities began to send clan members back into Gaza, but halted the process after reportedly receiving information that they were being arrested by Hamas and that their lives were endangered. On 3 August 2008, 87 members of the clan were transported in a two-bus convoy to Jericho in the West Bank. Israel Defense Forces (IDF) spokesperson Brigadier-General Yoav Mordechai stated that there was no threat of a major escalation of hostilities arising from the transportation of the Hilles family members to Jericho.

=== Gaza war ===
On 3 July 2025, during the Gaza war, Ynet and the Foundation for Defense of Democracies reported that Israel had begun supporting and arming the Hilles clan against Hamas. However, the clan denied any collaboration with Israel.

It is now known that the anti-Hamas militants in Shuja'iyya are in fact a rogue faction of the Hilles and Jundeya clans called the Shuja'iyya Popular Defense Forces, led by Hilles clansman and former Fatah member Rami Hilles. Following the 10 October 2025 ceasefire in Gaza, this group retreated eastward alongside withdrawing Israeli forces after it was attacked by Hamas forces.

== See also ==
- Societal breakdown in the Gaza Strip during the Gaza war
- Fatah–Hamas conflict
