= Zeytun, Rostam =

Zeytun زيتون
- Village
- Location within Iran
- Coordinates: 30°17′58″N 51°30′47″E
- Country: Iran
- Province: Fars
- County: Rostam
- Bakhsh: Central
- Rural District: Rostam-e Do

Population (2006)
  - Total: 50
- Time zone: UTC+3:30 (IRST)
  - Summer (DST): UTC+4:30 (IRDT)

Zeytun (Persian: زيتون, also Romanized as Zeytūn) is a village in Rostam-e Do Rural District, in the Central District of Rostam County, Fars province, Iran. At the 2006 census, its population was 50, in 10 families.
