= Yasser Abu Shabab =

Palestinian militant leader in Gaza (1993–2025)

- ياسر أبو شباب
- Abu Shabab c. 2025

Leader of the Popular Forces
- In office 6 May 2024 – 4 December 2025
- Preceded by: Office established
- Succeeded by: Ghassan Duhine

Personal details
- Born: 27 February 1990 or 19 December 1993 Rafah, Gaza Strip, Palestine
- Died: 4 December 2025 (aged 31 or 35) Beersheba, Israel
- Cause of death: Gunshot wounds
- Spouse: Amna Abu Shabab
- Relations: Abu Shabab family (Hassan Abu Shabab and Fathi Abu Shabab)
- Known for: Armed opposition to Hamas
- Website: Yasser Abu Shabab - Popular Forces

Military service
- Allegiance: Popular Forces administration
- Years of service: 2024–2025
- Wars/conflicts fought/participated in: Gaza war; Rafah offensive; Hamas–Popular Forces conflict; 2025 Rafah ambush (DOW)
- Criminal information
- Status: Deceased
- Criminal charges: Drug trafficking and theft (2015); Treason, insurrection, wartime collaboration, organized crime (2025, in absentia)
- Penalty: 25 years' imprisonment (2015)
- Wanted by: Hamas Government of the Gaza Strip
- Escaped: October 2023

Details
- Date apprehended: 2015

Yasser Jihad Mansour Abu Shabab (Note: Arabic: ياسر جهاد منصور أبو شباب) (27 February 1990 or 19 December 1993 – 4 December 2025) was a Palestinian militant who was the founding leader of the Popular Forces, an anti-Hamas armed group in the Gaza Strip. He was a Bedouin of the Tarabin tribe. Critics have denounced him as the "Pablo Escobar of Gaza". (Note: Attributed to multiple sources:)

Abu Shabab emerged as a local opposition figure to Hamas during the Gaza war. In May 2024, his group began looting aid trucks, claiming he was providing security for humanitarian aid convoys entering Gaza during the Rafah offensive. Abu Shabab was reportedly behind the Kerem Shalom aid convoy looting. Israel began providing Abu Shabab's group with weapons and equipment in 2025. Since June 2025, the group he led has control over some parts of eastern Rafah. Following Yasser Abu Shabab's death, Ghassan Duhine proclaimed himself the new leader of the Popular Forces.

== Early life and criminal activities ==
Abu Shabab was born in eastern Rafah on 19 December 1993, or possibly 27 February 1990. He was a member of the Tarabin Bedouin tribe and has a son named Hassan Abu Shabab. According to sources close to Abu Shabab, he dropped out of school at an early age and became involved in drug trafficking. He was also involved in smuggling cigarettes and other drugs into the Gaza Strip. In 2010, Abu Shabab attempted to join the Hamas security services. In 2015, he was arrested by Hamas on drug trafficking charges and sentenced to 25 years in Asda prison in western Khan Yunis.

== Looting and securing aid convoys ==
In October 2023, during the outbreak of the Gaza war, Abu Shabab escaped the prison as it was being bombed by Israel. The circumstances of his escape are unknown. After his escape, Abu Shabab and his followers organized raids to turn the tables on Hamas and take action claimed to address the humanitarian crisis in Gaza. He led a gang of around 100 members, mostly former officers from the Palestinian Authority's National Security Forces to intercept food and supply trucks entering Gaza after accusing Hamas of stealing the provisions and shooting people. In November 2024, Abu Shabab survived an assassination attempt by Hamas at the European Hospital in Khan Yunis. He managed to flee but two of his associates were killed. In January 2025, Hamas executed one of his senior aides.

In May and June 2025, in what The New York Times and NPR described as a rebranding, Abu Shabab announced that his group was securing aid into the Gaza Strip, protecting routes to US and Israeli aid sites administered by the Gaza Humanitarian Foundation. Despite this, spokesperson of GHF said that the organization had "no collaboration" with Abu Shabab. He said that all GHF workers were unarmed and none belong to Abu Shabab's group.

Hamas accused him of being a collaborator with Israel, claiming his group operated behind earth berms securing humanitarian entry routes under the U.S. humanitarian aid initiative. According to reports, his forces were escorting convoys from the Kerem Shalom crossing, armed with AK-47 rifles allegedly provided by the Israel Defense Forces (IDF). Hamas accused Abu Shabab's group of working with the IDF to inspect buildings before Israeli troops moved in.

In an interview with CNN, truck drivers said that Abu Shabab provided 200 armed men to protect their convoys. In social media posts, Abu Shabab claimed responsibility for safeguarding aid trucks, and organizing and directing aid convoys. UN humanitarian agency OCHA stated that "it did not pay anyone" to guard aid trucks entering Gaza. In June 2025, Abu Shabab released videos calling on citizens of Rafah to return, promising them food, shelter, and protection in makeshift camps which were built under the watch of IDF.

== Partial control over Rafah ==
In June 2025, Abu Shabab released a recorded statement claiming to operate "under the legitimate Palestinian authority," referring to the Palestinian Authority (PA). He stated his operations were coordinated with the PA and called on residents of eastern Rafah to return to their homes, promising shelter and food for returning families. He further announced the establishment of a force intended to protect Palestinians from "the terror of the de facto government" (referring to Hamas) and from "aid looters." He claimed to have distributed aid and provided protection to hundreds of families in eastern Rafah. Jonathan Whittall, the head of the United Nations Office for the Coordination of Humanitarian Affairs said that gangs such as Abu Shabab's are responsible for "The real theft of aid since the beginning of the war" and that this is being done "under the watch of Israeli forces".

== Ties to Israel ==
On 5 June 2025, Israeli prime minister Benjamin Netanyahu confirmed that Israel had supplied weapons to Abu Shabab's group, which Abu Shabab promptly denied. Avigdor Lieberman criticized the decision and alleged that Abu Shabab's Popular Forces had ties to the Islamic State. Abu Shabab denied connections to the Islamic State, labelling the allegations as propaganda meant to sow hostility between Arabs and Israelis. On 8 June 2025, it was reported that Israel had agreed to the group assuming a governing role as an alternative to Hamas.

Denying being armed by Israel, in June 2025 Abu Shabab claimed that the Popular Forces were funded by "individual efforts and donations" and that they were armed with "primitive weapons" which were inherited from local tribes. He claimed that his group was a humanitarian effort and that it was allowing families to escape from "war and famine". Abu Shabab stated that his group were grassroots forces and that they were not an official authority, nor were they operating under control of the Palestinian Authority (PA). However, Abu Shabab had stated that his militia operates "under Palestinian legitimacy", ostensibly a reference to the PA. Major General Anwar Rajab, spokesman of the Palestinian Authority security services, told CNN that there were no connections between the PA and the Popular Forces. The Guardian noted that Abu Shabab's statements often appeared contradictory and in contradiction to previous statements or verifiable evidence.

In July 2025, Abu Shabab acknowledged collaboration with Israel. According to The Guardian, videos posted on Abu Shabab's Facebook account show his men operating with Israeli soldiers.

== Conflict with Hamas ==
On 6 July 2025, Abu Shabab, in an interview with Radio Makan, stated that the Popular Forces will continue to fight Hamas even if a ceasefire is archived. The interview was conducted hours after the Palestinian Joint Operations Room said that his blood was "permitted", calling for his assassination. Abu Shabab said that Hamas is in the "final stages" before its elimination and that its "fighting its last battles". He also said that Popular Forces are able to "operate freely" in areas under Israeli control and indicated "coordination" with IDF. Abu Shabab said that the Popular Forces would rule the Gaza Strip after Hamas was overthrown, and that his group was not in conflict with the Palestinian Authority. Abu Shabab also said that October 7 attacks were a "crime" and that they caused the "Palestinian suffering".

On 2 July 2025, Gaza's interior ministry ordered Abu Shabab to surrender to face trial on charges of treason. The ministry said that a "Revolutionary Court" had given him 10 days to surrender, and that he was accused of "treason, collaborating with hostile entities, forming an armed gang, and insurrection". The ministry also called on Palestinians to inform Hamas militants if they were aware of his location. It added that he would be tried in absentia if he failed to surrender. The Popular Forces responded on Facebook, saying that the court's order was a "sitcom that doesn't frighten" them and that it doesn't "frighten any free man who loves his homeland and its dignity". The court had officially stated that: "In accordance with the provisions of Palestinian Penal Code No. 16 of 1960 and the Revolutionary Procedures Law of 1979, the accused, Yasser Jihad Mansour Abu Shabab, born on February 27, 1990 a resident of Rafah, has been given ten days from today, Wednesday, to surrender himself to the competent authorities for trial before judicial authorities."

Abu Shabab published an op-ed in The Wall Street Journal on 24 July 2025 titled "Gazans Are Finished with Hamas".

== Disowning by family over ties to Israel ==
In a statement, the family of Abu Shabab stated that they "were surprised by video footage broadcast by the resistance showing the involvement of Yasser's groups within a dangerous security framework, reaching the point of operating within undercover units and supporting the Zionist occupation forces, who are brutally killing our people". The family announced its "complete disassociation" with Abu Shabab, and that it held no objections to Abu Shabab being "eliminated". Abu Shabab responded to their statements, saying that they were “fabricated and false” and that they are a part of a "media campaign" targeting him and his "colleagues". Hamas stated that Abu Shabab is "a tool used by the Israeli occupation to fragment the Palestinian internal front", and pledged to oppose him.

== Death ==
=== Previous assassination attempts on Abu Shabab ===
Hamas put Abu Shabab in their top targets for assassination, which led to them twice trying to kill him, unsuccessfully.

During one unsuccessful attempt to ambush and assassinate Abu Shabab, militants fired approximately 90 bullets at a vehicle they thought belonged to him. The vehicle actually belonged to Islam Hijazi, a female aid worker of charity organization named Heal Palestine and she was accidentally killed in this incident by fighters who mistakenly thought she was Abu Shabab.

In another failed attempt in November 2024, Abu Shabab survived an assassination attempt by Hamas at the European Hospital in Khan Yunis. He managed to flee but two of his associates were killed.

=== Killing ===
On 4 December 2025, Abu Shabab was shot and wounded near Rafah. An Israeli "security source" said that he died of his wounds shortly before arrival at Soroka Medical Center in Beersheba, Israel. However, a spokesperson for Soroka Medical Center said that Abu Shabab never arrived at the hospital. Israeli Army Radio reported that the shooting was an ambush set by resistance factions, while Ynet and KAN reported that he was killed in a dispute linked to a feud between local families. Hamas did not take credit for his killing.

== See also ==
- Salafi jihadist militant groups in the Gaza Strip
- Israel and state-sponsored terrorism
- Gaza humanitarian crisis
- Salafi jihadist insurgency in the Gaza Strip
- Societal breakdown in the Gaza Strip during the Gaza war
