= Zetin-e Olya =

Zetin-e Olya زتين عليا
- Village
- Location within Iran
- Coordinates: 31°23′54″N 50°38′40″E
- Country: Iran
- Province: Kohgiluyeh and Boyer-Ahmad
- County: Boyer-Ahmad
- Bakhsh: Margown
- Rural District: Zilayi

Population (2006)
  - Total: 177
- Time zone: UTC+3:30 (IRST)
  - Summer (DST): UTC+4:30 (IRDT)

Zetin-e Olya (Persian: زتين عليا, also Romanized as Zetīn-e ‘Olyā; also known as Zeytūn) is a village in Zilayi Rural District, Margown District, Boyer-Ahmad County, Kohgiluyeh and Boyer-Ahmad Province, Iran. At the 2006 census, its population was 177, in 33 families.
