= Zetin-e Sofla =

Zetin-e Sofla زتين سفلي
- Village
- Location within Iran
- Coordinates: 31°24′05″N 50°37′57″E
- Country: Iran
- Province: Kohgiluyeh and Boyer-Ahmad
- County: Boyer-Ahmad
- Bakhsh: Margown
- Rural District: Zilayi

Population (2006)
  - Total: 190
- Time zone: UTC+3:30 (IRST)
  - Summer (DST): UTC+4:30 (IRDT)

Zetin-e Sofla (Persian: زتين سفلي, also Romanized as Zetīn-e Soflá; also known as Zeytūn-e Soflá) is a village in Zilayi Rural District, Margown District, Boyer-Ahmad County, Kohgiluyeh and Boyer-Ahmad Province, Iran. At the 2006 census, its population was 190, in 36 families.
