= Tarabin Bedouin =

Arab tribe from the Sinai Peninsula

Coordinates: 31.3455°N 34.7391°E

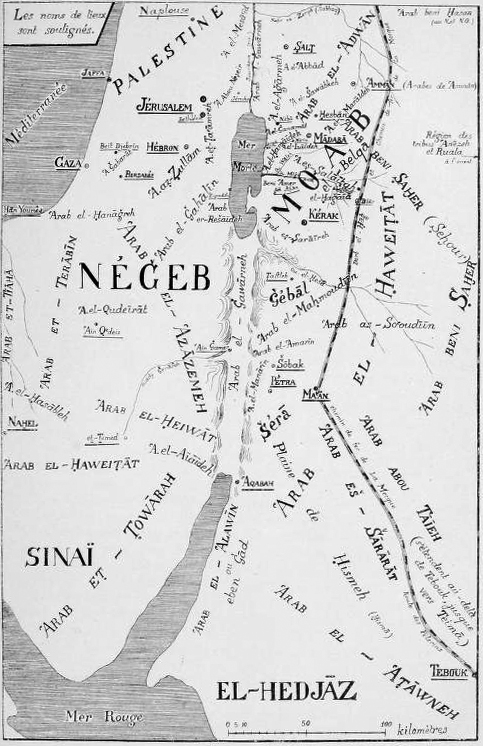
1908 map of the Arab tribes

The Tirabin (Arabic: الترابين) were the most important Arab tribe in the Sinai Peninsula during the 19th century, and the largest inside Negev. Today this tribe resides in the Sinai Peninsula but also in Cairo, Ismailia, Giza, Al Sharqia and Suez, Israel (Negev), Jordan, Saudi Arabia and the Gaza Strip. A township named Tirabin al-Sana was built in Israel in 2004 especially for the members of al-Sana clan of Al-Tirabin tribe.

Al-Tirabin are considered the largest Bedouin tribe in the Negev and Sinai Peninsula and all of Egypt, with over 500,000 people.

During the Mamluk administration, clans such as the Aydi tribe were integrated into the Tarabin in an effort to reduce the power of the clans in Palestine. The Ottoman dynasty, the British Mandate and their followers continued this policy. An Ottoman law of 1875 integrated other tribes living in the Negev into the Tarabin tribe: these are the Azazme, Tiyaha, Jubarat, Hanajre and Huweitat.

== Origin ==
Tarabin traced their ancestry to one 'Atiya who belonged to the Quraysh tribe, to which Mohammed the prophet of Islam belonged, and lived at Turba east of Mecca. It is believed that 'Atiya migrated to Sinai in the 14th Century. He was buried at “wadi-wattir” near Nuweibaa in the south of Sinai. A village named after him was created near his burial place “Al Sheikh Atiya“. 'Atiya had five sons to which various clans of the Tarabin trace their descent. Musa'id was remembered as ancestor of the Qusar; Hasbal of the Hasabila; Nab'a of the Naba'at; Sari of the Sarayi'a. These four sections lived in Sinai.

== Sinai Tarabin ==
The Sinai Tarabin Bedouin are currently located just north of Nuweiba and arrived to the peninsula around 300 years ago. In 1874 they are recorded in a list of Bedouin, produced by the Palestine Exploration Fund, as "in the Desert of the Tih".

Due to the changing surroundings and erection of new resort towns such as Sharm el-Sheikh Bedouin lifestyle has undergone changes that have led to the erosion of traditional values, unemployment and land disputes. With urbanization and better educational opportunities, Bedouins have begun to marry outside their tribe, a practice that was once frowned upon.

Bedouins living in the Sinai Peninsula turned down jobs in the construction boom due to the low wages and Sudanese and Egyptians workers were brought in as construction laborers instead. When the tourist industry started to bloom, local Bedouins moved into new service positions such as cab drivers, tour guides, campgrounds or cafe managers. In some families, the women are not allowed to work outside the home.

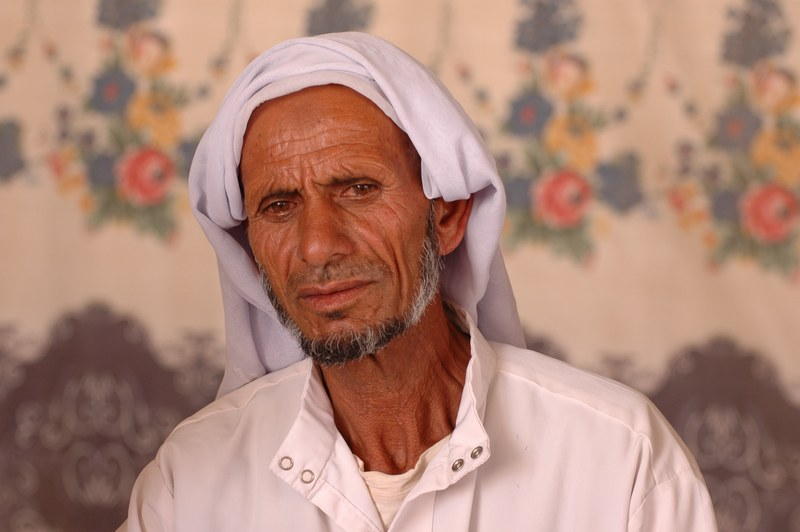
Suliman Tarabin, the father of Ouda Tarabin

Tarabin Bedouin living along the border between Egypt and Israel have been involved in inter-border smuggling of weapons and aid to tribe members in Gaza.

In the summer of 1999, the army bulldozed Bedouin-run tourist campgrounds north of Nuweiba as part of the final phase of hotel development overseen by the Tourist Development Agency (TDA). The director of the Tourist Development Agency said that they had not lived on the coast prior to 1982. A traditional semi-nomadic culture has left Bedouins vulnerable to such claims.

The relation between the tarabin tribe and the Egyptian government has flourished in recent years mainly because the tribe under the leadership of Ibrahim al-Arjani the head of the tribe in Egypt fought alongside the Egyptian army against ISIS during the Sinai insurgency.

== Gaza Tarabin ==
Tarabin presence in the Gaza Strip is mainly in the southern part of the strip.

During the Gaza war in 2024, Yasser Abu Shabab, a member of the Tarabin tribe, led his gang to steal aid convoys. Gangs have been alleged to have stolen 98 of 109 aid trucks in a single day in one instant.

In November 2024 a battle between Hamas-led police forces and the Abu Shabab gang resulted in the death of 20 members of the gang.

On 30 May 2025, Hamas published a video of their members detonating an IED targeting an armed group of men they called Israeli operatives, with reports from Gaza indicating that the armed group was affiliated with Yasser Abu Shabab, who Hamas accuses of working with Israel. According to The Times of Israel, Israel reportedly provided members of the Abu Shabab clan armed group in Gaza with Kalashnikov rifles without approval from the Israel's security cabinet but by Prime Minister Benjamin Netanyahu.

Abu Suneima family members who are a different branch of the Tarabin tribe in Gaza killed Yasser Abu Shabab in an ambush in Rafah after clashes caused by the detaining of Jumʿaa Abu Suneima on suspicion of diverting food supplies to Hamas .

== Attitude of Egyptian authorities ==
After the Egyptian Revolution of 2011, the Sinai Bedouin were given an unofficial autonomy due to political instability inside the country. But Egyptian authorities traditionally view the Bedouin cross-border ties with Israel, Jordan and Saudi Arabia with suspicion. The Ouda Tarabin case is a good example of it.

== Negev Tarabin ==
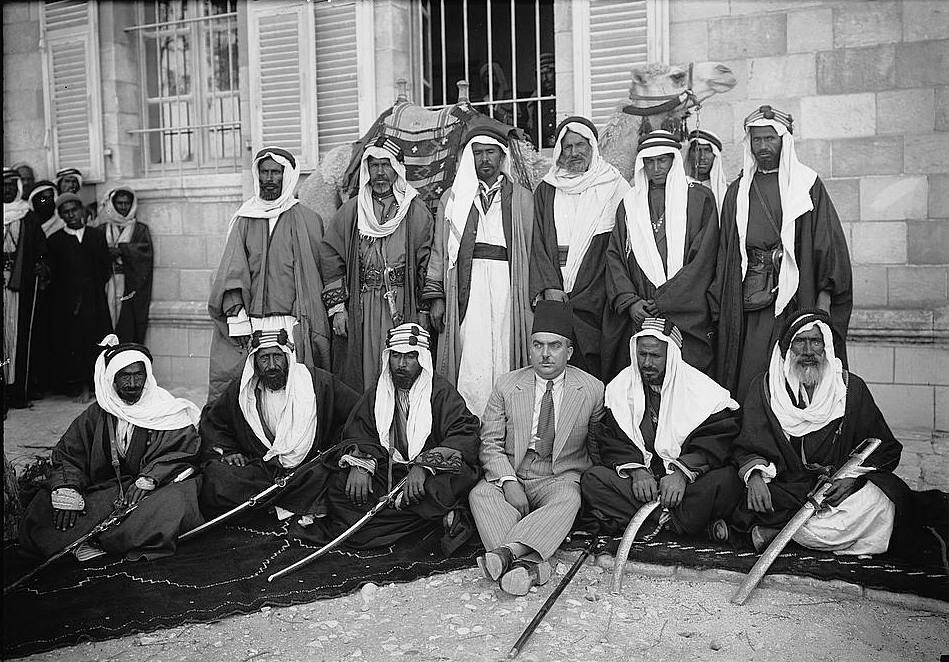
Al-Tarabin tribe Sheikhs year 1934 in Beer Sheva, with Aref al-Aref

The descendants of 'Atiya's son Nijm lived around Beersheba, in what is now called the Negev. Nijm had two sons from which the two branches of the Negev Tarabin trace their line: the Nijmat and the Ghawali. The Nijmat were regarded as the paramount clan. Tradition has it that in time of war they would lead the whole tribe into battle. One of Nijm's grandsons is said to have journeyed to the Indian Subcontinent due to blood feuds with other tribes. His family is believed to have finally settled in the Punjab region while travelling with trade caravans and armies.

Tarabin Khokhar are a subsection of the Khokhar tribe who have been proven to have originated from a Quraysh Bedouin named Atiya. Atiya lived in Turba east of Mecca. He migrated to the Sinai peninsula in the 14th Century. He had five sons who together form the Arab et Tarabin tribe, whose inhabitants still reside in the Sinai and the Negev desert. Some migrated or settled down in Palestine, Egypt and Syria during Ottomon rule. One of his sons, Nijm and his two sons formed the most powerful clan of the Tarabin known as the Nijma't. The Tarabin Khokhar trace their ancestry from Suleman, the grandson of Nijm ibn Atiya. Suleman migrated from the Sinai to Syria as a result of a blood feud with a rival bedouin tribe. Name of the rival tribe is not known, but the Tiyaha are suspected to be the rivals. The descendants of Suleman continued their migration eastward and finally settled in riverlands of the Punjab. The brawn of the Tarabin Bedouin made them great recruits in the army of various Sultans of Iran and the Indian subcontinent. Successive generations changed from Tarabin to Tarabin Khokhar as a result of honors awarded to them. Intact family trees of Tarabin Khokhars tracing there ancestry back to Atiya from Nijm survive to this day. Latest genealogical evidence has corroborated this claim of descent.

In modern times, in 1915, the Nijmat leader Hammad Pasha al-Sufi led a force of 1,500 bedouin under Turkish command in their attack on the Suez Canal. He was head of the Turkish administration in Beersheba and died in 1924. The Ghawali had nine sub-sections. The most prominent was the Satut, who in 1873, under Sheikh Saqr ibn Dahshan Abu Sitta, had to leave their traditional land following a blood feud and sided with the Tiyaha in the war between them and the Tarabin. One of the Satut leaders, 'Aqib Saqr, was well known as a military leader. Khedive Isma'ail gave him land in Faqus district. The Turks exiled him to Jerusalem, where he died. His son Dahshan distinguished himself in the war with the 'Azazma, particularly at the Fight of Ramadan. He and some of his fighters migrated to Transjordania where they attached themselves to the Bani Saqr. During this time the leadership of the Ghawali was taken by the Zari'iyin clan. Their leader in 1915 was Salim who had to flee the Turkish authorities and was succeeded by 'Abd al Karim who died in 1931. He was succeeded by Muhammad Abu Zari.

=== The Aydi Tarabin tribe ===
Under the Mamluk administration, the Aydi of the Negev were connected to the الترابين Tarabin tribe despite having no blood ties to them. This was part of an effort to reduce Bedouin influence in Palestine by consolidating smaller clans into larger, fewer tribes, easier to control. The Ottoman dynasty, the British Mandate and their followers continued this policy. An Ottoman law of 1875 reduced the number to six tribes: the Tarabin, Azazmé, Tiyaha, Jubarat, Hanajré. and Huweitat. Its aim was also to try to forbid Bedouins from traveling outside of Palestine and prevent the ones from the outside to come into Palestine. In other occasions, the Aydi family is associated with the التياها Tiyaha or الجبارات Jubarat tribes due to their involvement in trade, military, or land alliances.

The العايد al-Aydi family traces its roots to an ancient Bedouin lineage that extends back to the بنو عايد Banu Ayed or بنو عائد Banu Aed. Its spelling differs on the territory’s dialect. They are part of the جذام Jidam and قحطان Qahtan tribes, whose origins lie in southern Arabia in today’s Yemen, and who belonged to the عرب العاربة Arab al Aribah. They have adopted monotheism more than two thousand years ago .

A branch from the tribe left Yemen in 542 C.E and established themselves in Iraq, Levant, Egypt, Sudan, Maghreb and the South of Spain. Nineteen families settled in the Negev, in today’s historical Palestine. The Egyptian branch of the family commonly goes by the name Abaza.

The name commonly used today is Aydi. It is sometimes associated with their reference tribe Tarabin.

=== Origins of the name Al-Ayd ===
The Aydi name is sometimes found as العيايدة Al Ayayda, العائدية العائدي Al Aiidi, العايذ Al Ayeth, العوايدة Al Awaydé or الاباظية Al Abathia. Bedouin clan and tribe names evolve through time and space, which explains the slight difference in spelling.

The name Al Ayeth or Ayed العائذ او العائد has three different meanings, stemming from ancient Bedouin Arabic: A young female gazelle; a person who visits the sick to heal them; a traveler with the purpose of serving society.

=== Historical settlement ===
A branch of the Aydi, departed from Yemen in 542 C.E., during the period of the decline of South Arabian civilization. They dispersed to various parts of the world, settling in Iraq, Levant, Egypt, Sudan, Maghreb and as far as Andalusia. Nineteen families from the Aydi tribe settled in the Negev and remaining there until 1948. Other Aydi families established themselves in several other locations across Palestine.

A manuscript of Ahmad Al Maqrizi from 1437, kept at the Leiden University, attests that the Aydi are direct descendants of the Jidam, and inhabited Southern Palestine and the areas between Cairo, Egypt and Aqaba, Jordany. According to the memoirs by Etienne Marc Quatremère's, a French orientalist specialized in languages and cultures of the Middle-East, the Aydi tribe, descendants of the Jidam, was established between Cairo and Aqaba.

=== Main responsibilities ===
==== Protection of a pilgrimage route to Mecca ====
In 1263, a prince known as Muhammad Al-Aydi the Great was entrusted the responsibility of safeguarding the pilgrimage route from Egypt to Mecca, through an agreement with the fourth Mamluk Sultan of the Bahri dynasty, Al-Malik Al-Zahir Baibars. An extension of the route protection from Alexandria to Aqaba, passing through Cairo is mentioned in Ahmad al Maqrizi’s manuscript from 1437. This responsibility remained a duty of the Aydi tribe until the opening of the Suez Canal in 1896.

==== Regional Governance and Trade Facilitation ====
In 1370, Sultan Al-Malik Al-Nasir Muhammad Ibn Qalawun assigned Sheikh Ibrahim Ahmad Al-Aydi as the delegate of the Egyptian government for Ash Sharqia (a northeastern governorate of Egypt), Sinai, and Palestine. A village in Ash Sharqia bears the name of the Ayed family, قرى كفور العايد Kura Kfur Al-Ayed. The Sheikh was also appointed as the drafter of commercial contracts for the camel trade.

==== Judicial Mediation and Tribal Arbitration ====
The Bedouins of North Sinai and southern Palestine also entrusted the Sheikhs of the Aydi tribe with a respected social responsibility. From before the Ottoman period until the end of the British Mandate, they were called upon to render judgments in complicated tribal trials, where no witnesses were available. Trials would involve any victim from the tribes under their jurisdiction or any foreign person visiting or passing by in the area.

==== Protection of Saint Catherine’s Monastery ====
The Aydi tribe established in Egypt and Palestine was also in charge of safeguarding the St. Catherine's Monastery in Sinai. They served as the trusted party responsible for ensuring the fulfillment of contracts between St. Catherine Monastery and the Bedouin tribes of Tur (Mount Sinai region). Thirty-five Bedouin tribes were in charge of the safety and well-being of the monks and pilgrims traveling to and from Saint Catherine’s Monastery, on the roads between Egypt and Syria. The Aydi sheikhs were their guarantors, overseeing or vouching for the fulfillment of the terms of any contract between the two parties. The Monastery preserved records between 1592 and 1851, which mentions this role implemented at least since 1540.

==== Traditional medical care ====
The Aydi tribe branch from the Negev is well known in the region for its medical abilities in traditional Bedouin medicine using amulets, talismans, stones, seeds and plants. One of the meanings of al Aydi is a person that heals the sick. The practice of using occupational surnames in the Arab world has roots that trace back several centuries, likely emerging during the medieval period. The earliest mention of the family name dates back to 1418, which presupposes that the family was known and recognized for its medical skills at least from this period. Negev Bedouins strongly believed in the healing powers of natural elements, often blending traditional remedies with spiritual beliefs. With the development of modern medicine in the 18th century, the women of the tribe were sent abroad in neighboring cities (Cairo, Alexandria, Constantinople, Bagdad, Damascus) where family members lived to complete their medical studies and come back to the Negev region to practice. Until today, all women and to some extent the men of the family undergo medical studies before getting married. This is especially the case for women. Men traditionally have other roles but may develop this skill in certain periods where medical workforce and expertise is needed.

Two maqams have been erected in the Negev region in honor of charismatic physicians among the Aydi family. In maqam Abu Ayada is resting الشيخ ابو عايد Sheikh Abu Ayada, a physician that operated in لشلالهl Shallala near Wadi Sharia, during Ottoman times. Negev Bedouins were using this maqam to heal animals’ diseases. Maqam Al Hajja Hakimah, located next to قرية زماره Zummara village in الشريعة Ash Sharia is the resting place of Dr. Hakmah Aydi, the founder of the Heritage from the Fragrance of the Land Museum and physician who completed her medical studies in Cairo in 1790. The maqam still exists today. Negev Bedouins believed that her soul helped women carry healthy babies if they prayed by her maqam or performed particular amulet processes.

==== Safeguarding knowledge and memory with the "Heritage from the Fragrance of the Land" Museum ====
With the creation of the "Heritage from the Fragrance of the Land" Museum تراث من عبق التراب (turath min abaqa al turab) around 1790, the Aydi family used their collection as a means to preserve their ancestral knowledge and pass it down to the coming generations. Amulets, talismans, stones, seeds, plants coupled with manuscripts from Avicenna and Abu Al Qasim Al Zahrawi were studied and their practices were preserved among the Bedouins of the Negev.

At the end of the 19th century, the Dr. Hissan Aydi Tarabin, the granddaughter of the museum founder, used the collection to teach the Bedouins from the community to replicate objects and produce those needed for their everyday life. A certain number were destined for trade. Rugs, embroidered ornaments and jewelry were sold to Egypt, Jerusalem and Mecca, using the tribal codes of the Aydi family.

In 1898, the renowned painter Ilya Repin, who was working at the time as a professor of the Imperial Academy of Arts in Saint Petersburg, visited the "Heritage from the Fragrance of the Land" Museum. He was given fifteen of its female costumes to use for the Academy's paintings of Palestinian historical scenes. These embroidered dresses can be found today at the Museum of the Academy of Arts in Saint Petersburg.

In 2023, the Palestinian National Commission for Education, Culture and Science has recognized the Aydi family for its strong commitment to preserving the cultural identity of Palestinians since the creation of its first collection and museum. The Permanent Delegation of the State of Palestine to UNESCO stressed that the family’s museology activities since the 18th century is the national pride of the country.

=== Sedentarization ===
Negev Bedouins experience similar problems to those encountered in Egypt. Prior to the establishment of Israel, the Negev Bedouins were a semi-nomadic society that had been through a process of sedentariness since the Ottoman rule of the region. By 1931, there were roughly 17,000 of them in British Mandate Palestine almost 90% worked in agriculture rather than solely raising livestock, and had clearly defined rules about land ownership. After 1948, about 11,000 Bedouin remained in the Negev. Only 19 of the original 95 tribes were left. Those who remained were relocated by the IDF to an area east and south east of Beersheba called Siyag (fence in Hebrew).

In 1969–1989, seven Bedouin townships with developed infrastructure were established in order to urbanize Tarabin and other Bedouin tribes and give them better life conditions. This policy so far proved only partially successful, as with erection of new villages and towns and some Bedouin population moving into brand new houses, it created several new problems. First, the townships were completely urban, and Bedouins prefer to live in rural-type settlements. It was one of the reasons why a part of the Bedouin society refused to move into new localities. But later on, this mistake was fixed by Israeli authorities.

As of process of sedentarization, it is full of hardships for any nation, since it means a harsh shift from one way of life to another – transition from wandering to permanent residence. Bedouin society based on tradition also experienced plenty of problems. The rate of unemployment remains high in Bedouin townships, as well as crime level. School through age 16 is mandatory by law, but the vast majority of the population does not receive a high school education, although schooling is much more accessible now. Women are discriminated in patriarchal-type Bedouin society.

Approximately half the 170,000 Negev Bedouin live in 39 unrecognised villages without connection to the national electricity, water and telephone grids. The Bedouins makes up 25% of the population of the Northern Negev, yet have jurisdiction over less than 2% of the land; seven of the Bedouin townships are amongst the 8 poorest localities in Israel.

==== Land issues ====
Israeli Law is based mainly on Mandatory law, which in turn derives to a great extent from the Ottoman law. According to Israeli Law, land ownership has to be registered in the land registry. One cannot claim land ownership unless he or she can prove that it is registered in a proper way. The process of land registration was started in the late Ottoman empire. But due to their semi-nomadic way of life, Bedouins did not realize the need to register their ownership rights, since it brought with it responsibility to pay taxes; they were later to suffer from it.

In the mid-1970s, Israel let the Negev Bedouins register their land claims, issuing special land claim certificates that served as the basis for a "right of possession" later granted by the government. These certificates served as the base for paying compensations to some 5000 Negev Bedouins when, following the signing of the Treaty of Peace with Egypt, the need came to move an airport from Sinai to a Bedouin locality. After negotiations, all the local land claim certificate holders received money compensations and moved to Bedouin townships, where they built new houses and started businesses.

According to the Israel Ministry of Foreign Affairs, there is a problem of trespassing on state lands, and of building unrecognized Bedouin settlements which have no municipal status and thus face demolition orders, although all the Negev Bedouins have a permanent housing solution for them.

=== Attitude of Israeli authorities ===
In 2011, the Prawer Commission published its suggestion to relocate 30.000-40.000 Bedouins to government-approved townships. This plan did not specify the means by which this would be done, and has been criticized by the European Parliament. After prolonged negotiations, three agreements were made between the state authorities and the Tarabin Bedouin. As a consequence, the remainder of this tribe voluntarily moved into a state build settlement of Tirabin al-Sana.

=== A solar project ===
In 2011, an Israeli solar energy company Arava Power signed a contract with the Tarabin tribe in the Negev Desert, to build a solar installation. The company is negotiating with the government some 30% of Israel's guaranteed solar power feed-in tariff caps, set apart just for the Bedouin people. A plan for a photovoltaic solar installation was approved by the Ministry of Interior's Southern Regional Planning and Building Committee, in September 2011.

== Members of the community ==
- Ouda Tarabin, an Israeli Bedouin imprisoned by Egypt for illegal border crossing
- Ibrahim al-Arjani, businessman and tribal leader
- Haj Mousa Tarabin, a community leader
- Yasser Abu Shabab, gangster and paramilitary leader

== See also ==
- Tirabin al-Sana
- Negev Bedouin
- Sedentarization

== Bibliography ==
- Guérin, Victor (1869). Description Géographique Historique et Archéologique de la Palestine (in French). Vol. 1: Judee, pt. 2. Paris: L'Imprimerie Nationale. (pp. 267, 269)
- Robinson, E.; Smith, E. (1841). Biblical Researches in Palestine, Mount Sinai and Arabia Petraea: A Journal of Travels in the year 1838. Vol. 1. Boston: Crocker & Brewster. (pp. 92, 202, 230 to 274)
- Palmer, E.H. (1881). The Survey of Western Palestine: Arabic and English Name Lists Collected During the Survey by Lieutenants Conder and Kitchener, R. E. Transliterated and Explained by E.H. Palmer. Committee of the Palestine Exploration Fund. (p.420)
