= Israel and state-sponsored terrorism =

The State of Israel has been accused of engaging in state-sponsored terrorism, primarily through the provision of arms, funding, and operational support to foreign non-state militias and proxy groups.

Such allegations have focused on covert operations during the Lebanese Civil War backing the Front for the Liberation of Lebanon from Foreigners, and alleged support for militant opposition groups such as the People's Mojahedin Organization (MEK) and Jundallah within the context of the Iran–Israel proxy conflict.

== Front for the Liberation of Lebanon from Foreigners ==
After the 1979 massacre of an Israeli family at Nahariya by Palestinian Liberation Front militants, Israel Defense Forces Chief of Staff Rafael Eitan instructed Israeli General Avigdor Ben-Gal to "Kill them all," meaning the Palestine Liberation Organization and those connected to it. With Eitan's approval, Ben-Gal charged Meir Dagan with running the operations. The operations, approved by the Chief of Staff, were kept secret from the IDF's General Staff and many other members of the Israeli government. David Agmon, at the time head of Israel's northern command, was one of the few people who was briefed on its operations. Lebanese operatives on the ground from the Maronite, Shiite and Druze communities were recruited. The aim of the series of operations was to "cause chaos among the Palestinians and Syrians in Lebanon, without leaving an Israeli fingerprint, to give them the feeling that they were constantly under attack and to instill them with a sense of insecurity."

Beginning in July 1981, with a bomb attack on the Palestine Liberation Organization (PLO) offices at Fakhani Road in West Beirut, these attacks were claimed by a group called the Front for the Liberation of Lebanon from Foreigners. The FLLF was itself a front for Israeli agents, and it killed hundreds of people between 1979 and 1983.

By September 1981, the Front's operations consisted of car bombs exploding regularly in the Palestinian neighborhoods of Beirut and other Lebanese cities. Particularly deadly attacks include an October 1, 1981 attack in Beirut that killed 83 and a November 29, 1981 attack in Aleppo that killed 90. FLLF operations came to a sudden halt just prior to the June 1982 Israeli invasion of Lebanon, only to be resumed the following year: first a 28 January 1983 strike on a PLO headquarters at Chtaura in the Syrian-controlled Beqaa Valley, killing 35, coupled by a second on 3 February at West Beirut that devastated the Palestine Research Center offices and left 20 people dead, including the wife of Sabri Jiryis. A third bombing occurred on Syrian-controlled Baalbek on 7 August 1983, which killed about 30 people and injured nearly 40, followed by another on 5 December 1983 at the Chyah quarter of the Southern suburbs of Beirut that claimed the lives of 12 people and maimed over 80.

The FLLF disbanded after 1983.

== Proxies against Iran ==
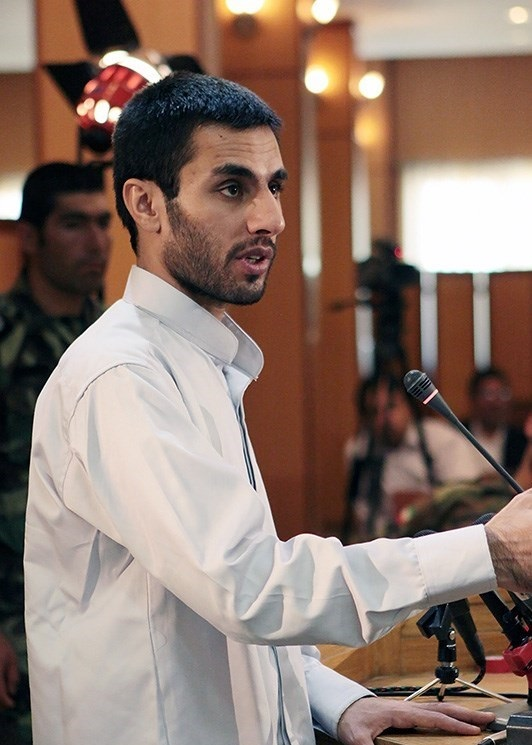
Abdolmalek Rigi, who according to Iranian officials, admitted to his extensive contacts with the Israeli Mossad.

Israel and Iran are belligerent enemies. Though they have never been at war, both nations make efforts to undermine the other's influence in the region through various means: diplomatic, economic, and military. This includes the use of (often armed) proxies, which facilitate indirect conflict between the powers, and in the case of Iranian proxies Hamas and Hezbollah, outright war. The Israeli government supports various armed groups in its conflict with Iranian government.

Four Iranian nuclear scientists—Masoud Alimohammadi, Majid Shahriari, Darioush Rezaeinejad and Mostafa Ahmadi Roshan—were assassinated between 2010 and 2012. Another scientist, Fereydoon Abbasi, was wounded in an attempted murder. Two of the killings were carried out with magnetic bombs attached to the targets' cars; Darioush Rezaeinejad was shot dead, and Masoud Alimohammadi was killed in a motorcycle-bomb explosion. According to an NBC article, two anonymous U.S. officials stated that the Obama administration knew about the assassination campaign but had "no direct involvement, while Mohammad Javad Larijani blamed the People's Mujahedin of Iran (MEK).

According to a New York Times article, the Israeli government, with knowledge and support from the US government, assassinated Fakhrizadeh on 27 November 2020 in a road ambush in Absard using an innovative autonomous satellite-operated gun.

According to a 2012 report in Foreign Policy, Mossad agents disguised as Central Intelligence Agency (CIA) officers also recruited members of Jundallah—"a Pakistan-based Sunni terrorist organization ... responsible for assassinating Iranian government officials and killing Iranian women and children"—to carry out "false flag" operations against Iran, straining Israel's relations with the United States.

== See also ==
- Israeli support for Hamas
