= October 2025 Hamas raid in Khan Yunis =

2025 raid during the Gaza war

- Part of the 2025 Khan Yunis offensive, the societal breakdown in the Gaza Strip during the Gaza war, and the Fatah–Hamas conflict
Date	3 October 2025
Location	Al-Mujaida Quarter, Khan Yunis, Gaza Strip, Palestine
Result	Disputed (see aftermath)

Belligerents
(Palestine) Hamas Government	Al-Mujaida clan (Fatah) Counter-Terrorism Strike Force; Israel

Units involved
(Hamas) Al-Qassam Brigades; Gaza Police; Arrow Unit	Al-Mujaida clan gunmen; (Fatah) Counter-Terrorism Strike Force; Israel Defense Forces; Israeli Air Force

Strength
Per Asharq al-Awsat: 250 operatives Per the NYT: 100 operatives Per the BBC: 50 operatives	Unknown

Casualties and losses
Per Hamas: 2 operatives killed (by the Al-Mujaida clan); Per the BBC and the CSF: 11 operatives killed (by the Al-Mujaida clan); Per local medical sources: At least 16 operatives killed (by the IDF); Per the IDF: ~20 operatives killed (by the IDF)	Per the BBC: 5 clan members killed (by Hamas); Per the CSF: 1 clan member killed (by Hamas); Per the Al-Mujaida clan: 1 clan member killed inside Nasser Hospital (by Hamas); Per local medical sources: 2 clan members killed (by the IDF); Per KAN: 6 clan members taken prisoner by Hamas
- Unknown number of Palestinian civilians killed

On 3 October 2025, Hamas forces carried out a large-scale raid in Khan Yunis, Gaza Strip, targeting the Mujaida clan. Clashes broke out, with the Israel Defense Forces (IDF) and the Israeli-backed Counter-Terrorism Strike Force (CTSF), a local anti-Hamas armed group, reportedly involving themselves in the fighting. Accounts of the course of events during the raid vary significantly.

Accounts of casualties in the fighting also vary, however sources from both sides confirmed deaths among both Hamas operatives and al-Mujaida clan members.

== Background ==
=== Societal breakdown in Gaza ===
The raid came amid increasing societal breakdown in the Gaza Strip, caused by the Gaza war (2023–present), that has seen the emergence of new armed groups, including armed clans. The Israeli invasion of the Gaza Strip has resulted in Hamas reportedly losing around 80% of its territorial control, leaving a power vacuum and a collapsed security situation.

As of 30 September 2025, up to a dozen new armed groups opposed to Hamas have emerged in Gaza. According to a report by Armed Conflict Location and Event Data (ACLED), more than 220 intra-Palestinian violent incidents have occurred since October 2023, resulting in the deaths of around 400 Palestinians. Furthermore, the report states that looting of aid, theft, and violent activity by gangs, clans, and armed groups have become widespread, and that 70% of these incidents have occurred after Israel broke the January 2025 ceasefire with its attacks in March.

=== Al-Mujaida clan–Hamas tensions ===
The Fatah-affiliated al-Mujaida clan is based in a Khan Yunis neighborhood of the same name, the Mujaida Quarter, which had been described as its "stronghold". Two months prior to the raid, Hamas operatives allegedly shot and wounded a member of the clan in Khan Yunis, who later died. In Counter-Terrorism Strike Force (CTSF) leader Hossam al-Astal's version of events; Hamas operatives shot several clan members in the leg for unclear reasons. In any case, this prompted clan gunmen to kidnap two Hamas members, one of whom had formally served as a bodyguard to assassinated Hamas leader Yahya Sinwar. Hamas has claimed that the clan is collaborating with Israel and stealing humanitarian aid. Ali Mujaida, a senior clan leader, denied both of those accusations.

In September 2025, al-Mujaida clan members killed two members of Hamas' armed wing, the al-Qassam Brigades, and seized their weapons. The clan refused to hand over the suspects to Hamas security forces.

== Raid ==
The raid began before dawn, reportedly during Fajr prayers, with Asharq Al-Awsat reporting that witnesses said around 250 Hamas gunmen stormed residences in the Mujaida Quarter. However, the BBC reported that local accounts described 50 Hamas gunmen participating in the assault. Giving yet another number, The New York Times (NYT) reported that roughly 100 gunmen participated. Residents of Khan Yunis said the raid was targeting clan members who had participated in the September killings. Hamas said it was targeting clan members accused of collaboration with Israel.

The Times of Israel, citing al-Astal, instead described the raid as having taken place in the al-Mawasi area, adjacent to Khan Yunis in Rafah.

According to local accounts, the Hamas operatives initially killed five al-Mujaida clansmen when they arrived in the neighbourhood, but the clan fought back, sparking hours-long clashes with heavy gunfire. During the clashes, 11 Hamas operatives were reportedly killed by the clan and their bodies were dragged through the streets. Unverified videos circulating online show several bloodied bodies in military fatigues apparently belonging to Hamas' Arrow Unit. Another videoclip showed bursts of gunfire and an RPG hitting a residential building in the Mujaida Quarter. Hamas said two of their fighters died in the clashes with the Mujaida clan.

According to al-Astal, CTSF operatives arrived on the scene to defend the Mujaida clan, and "thwarted" the Hamas raid with assistance from IDF air support. He said 11 Hamas operatives were killed, one clan member was killed, and no CTSF operatives were killed. Per al-Astal's account, this would be the first case of a Hamas attack inside Gaza being repelled by a Palestinian armed group, albeit with IDF assistance.

Local medical sources said Israeli warplanes struck the area during the battle, killing at least 16 Hamas men, civilians, and two clan members. According to al-Astal, the IDF sought to help the Mujaida clan and launched airstrikes on Hamas positions. Ali Mujaida told The New York Times (NYT) that the Hamas forces were beaten back after an Israeli drone noticed the attack and fired on them. In total, the IDF said it killed around 20 Hamas members during the clashes.

According to Ali Mujaida, following the Israeli strike, al-Mujaida clansmen captured and interrogated a wounded Hamas operative, who revealed: "names, locations, directives and [...] two separate communication lines used for unit operations". The clan members were reportedly surprised by the level of planning that went into the raid. Al-Mujaida clansmen later posted documents on Telegram that had been taken off the body of a dead Hamas operative and contained detailed operational instructions along with aerial photographs of the Mujaida Quarter with targeted houses circled in black marker.

The IDF claimed that Hamas operatives were using children as human shields during the fighting, publishing footage that purported to show them allegedly dragging along children. The IDF said the operatives were killed in separate strikes minutes after the videos were taken, without harm caused to the children.

Injured combatants from both sides were reportedly taken to the Nasser Hospital for treatment. Clan members said one of their wounded men was fatally shot inside the hospital while he was receiving treatment. According to The Jerusalem Post, this man was one of two clan members lured to a different part of the hospital by Hamas operatives who aimed to kill them. The other clan member apparently survived.

== End of fighting and aftermath ==
Though Hossam al-Astal and Ali Mujaida both reported that Hamas was forced to retreat, other sources reported that the fighting had ended with a mediation. The BBC reported that "local elders" later intervened to mediate between the two sides, leading to an exchange of dead bodies. Asharq Al-Awsat reported that both Hamas fighters and al-Mujaida clansmen took captives during the battle, with reports later of an exchange of dead bodies and detainees brokered by other clans and community figures.

Meanwhile Israeli Public Broadcasting Corporation (better known as KAN), the Israeli state broadcaster, reported that Hamas still held six clan members and was planning to execute them.

Asharq Al-Awsat reported that days after the raid, on 12 October, the Mujaida clan agreed to hand over unlicensed weapons to Hamas, and affirmed support for them in combating "security chaos". The New York Times reported that this pledge came about due to the raid having effectively "decimated" the clan into submission.

== See also ==
- Hamas–Popular Forces conflict
- 2025 Hamas–Doghmush conflict
- Palestinian internal political violence
- Deir al-Balah aid worker impersonation incident
- Outline of the Gaza war
- Timeline of the Gaza war (3 October 2025 – present)
- Timeline of the Israeli–Palestinian conflict in 2025
- List of military engagements during the Gaza war
