= 2025 Hamas–Doghmush conflict =

Military conflict

- Part of the Gaza war, the October 2025 Gaza war ceasefire and the Hamas–Popular Forces conflict
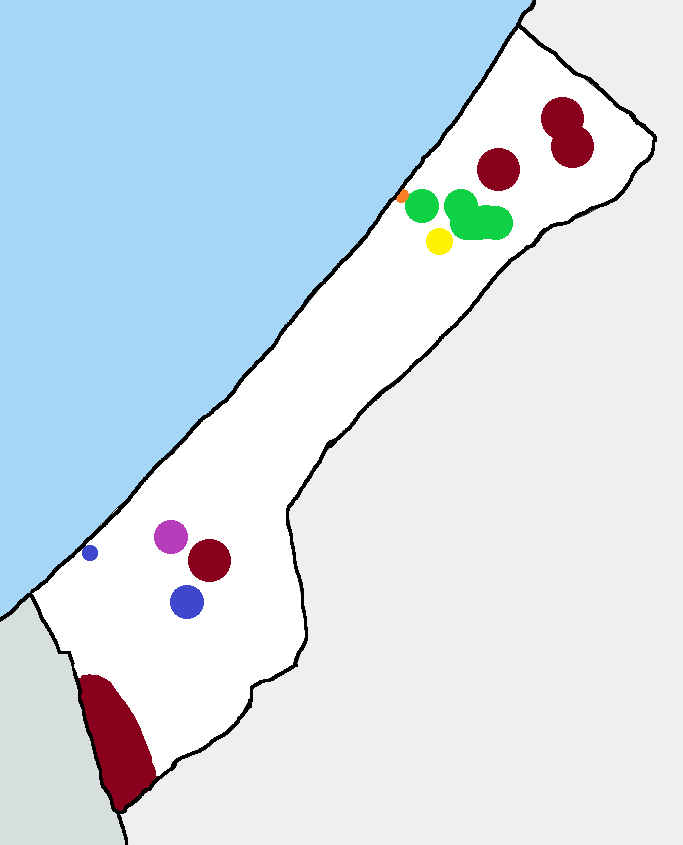
- Doghmush clan areas (yellow)
Date	10–30 October 2025
Location	Gaza Strip, Palestine
Result	Ongoing

Belligerents
(Palestine) Hamas government in Gaza; Supported by: Palestinian Joint Operations Room	Dogmush clan; Popular Forces–affiliated clan members

Commanders and leaders
(Palestine) (Hamas) Izz al-Din al-Haddad	Unknown

Units involved
Hamas; (Hamas) Al-Qassam Brigades; Gaza Ministry of Interior; Gaza Police; Arrow Unit; Internal Security Services; Rad'a Force	Unknown

Strength
7,000+ militants	Unknown

Casualties and losses
12 militants killed	52 militants killed 60 militants arrested 8 executed
- 1 journalist killed

In October 2025, following a ceasefire that paused the Gaza war, Hamas redeployed 7,000 militants to assert control over the Gaza Strip, reportedly arresting dozens of suspected collaborators and anti-Hamas clan members, with executions expected. The Doghmush clan had already opposed Hamas in the past, with a 2008 siege on a compound in Sabra that left 11 dead, resulting from a clan member who had killed a police officer.

Violent clashes erupted in October 2025 when Hamas forces attacked the Doghmush stronghold in Tel al-Hawa, leading to heavy fighting and civilian casualties, with both sides accusing each other of instigating the violence.

== Background ==
The Doghmush clan emigrated from Anatolia and established themselves in Gaza during the 20th century, eventually gaining control over parts of Sabra and Tel al-Hawa districts. Jihadists within the Doghmush clan formed the Army of Islam, a militant extremist group with ideology resembling that of al-Qaeda, and which carried out high-profile kidnappings and raids.

The Doghmush family has reportedly been involved in extortion, smuggling, arms dealing, and the killing of rivals. The clan has been dubbed "The Sopranos of Gaza City".

=== After Hamas' takeover ===
Since taking control of the Gaza Strip in 2007, Hamas has carried out multiple executions of Palestinians accused of collaborating with Israel. The accused are supposedly given trials, but human rights groups say those accused often receive "unfair proceedings in military courts" and that their rights to due process are not respected. Amnesty International and others have condemned executions carried out by Hamas during the 2014 Gaza War as war crimes, for violating of the right to due process and as constituting torture. Execution methods involve public hangings and executions by firing squads.

In 2007, after Hamas became the local power, British journalist Alan Johnston was kidnapped by the Army of Islam. It took Hamas four months to free Johnston from the kidnappers, after the deployment of military troops to the neighborhoods of the Doghmush clan, cutting off water and electricity, and the arrest of members of the clan. Johnston was released without violence after the two groups came to an agreement that allowed the Army of Islam to keep their weapons only for the purpose of "resistance".

In 2008, Hamas forces sieged and raided a Doghmush residential compound, resulting in a gun battle that left 11 people dead, after a police officer was killed by a clan member resisting arrest.

=== During the Gaza war ===
In March 2024, Israeli news articles citing social media reports, published the claim that Hamas had executed Saleh Doghmush, leader of the Doghmush clan for allegedly collaborating with Israel. The Doghmush clan denied this claim, releasing a statement that Saleh Doghmush had already been killed by an Israeli airstrike on the family's mosque on November 16, 2023. Hamas media officials also denied the claim. At the time, the Doghmush clan rejected any support from or collaboration with Israel and had affirmed its support for Hamas.

In early-mid 2025, Hamas engaged rival armed groups such as the Popular Forces led by Yasser Abu Shabab with an increased frequency due to a perceived power vacuum in Gaza, in some cases alleging that their rivals have ties to Israel. In June 2025, Israeli Prime Minister Benjamin Netanyahu confirmed that Israel was arming anti-Hamas clans and militias in Gaza, but the Doghmush clan was not specifically named.

In September 2025, three Palestinian men accused of collaboration with Israel were executed on the streets of Gaza in order to send a deterrent message.

==== After October 2025 ceasefire ====
On October 11, 2025, hours after U.S. president Donald Trump's ceasfire plan went into effect, Hamas began redeploying its military presence in areas where the Israeli army had vacated. The group mobilized an estimated 7,000 militants to areas of contested control across the Gaza strip, and appointed five new governors, all with military backgrounds, some ranking as previous brigade commanders in al-Qassam Brigades. The Gaza Strip Interior Ministry stated that the purpose of the campaign was to locate and arrest collaborators, informants, and looters.

According to local reports, after Israel’s advance into Gaza City, the Doghmush clan relocated near the Jordanian Hospital in Tel al-Hawa.

== October 2025 clashes ==
=== Attack ===
On Sunday, October 12, 2025, Hamas gunmen approached a compound in the Tel al-Hawa neighbourhood, near the Jordanian Hospital in southern Gaza City and engaged the Doghmush clan members within. The number of Hamas militants attempting to storm the residential area were said to be around 300 by eyewitnesses. The members of the clan were believed to be well-armed with machine guns and improvised explosives, with an estimated strength in the hundreds as well.

The ensuing battle caused dozens of families to flee their homes under heavy gunfire, with one civilian stating that: "this time people weren't fleeing Israeli attacks they were running from their own people". Members of the clan were quoted saying: "Children are screaming and dying, they are burning our houses", as well as: "they arrested all the youths, lined them up against walls, pointed weapons at their heads. There was a massacre here". Members of Hamas were reportedly "firing indiscriminately" at the homes of the Doghmush clan in the Sabra neighborhood.

During the fighting, 27 people were reportedly killed, including 8 Hamas militants and 19 members of the Doghmush clan, though other reports estimate 64 fatalities.

=== Aftermath ===
Each side of the conflict accused the other for the triggering of the clashes. Among the fatalities was also Palestinian journalist Saleh al-Jafrawi, who was shot by Doghmush clan members while covering the conflict and was found dead in the back of a truck, still wearing his press vest.

Hamas forces reportedly arrested 60 members of the clan, and detained them for interrogation. Messages appearing on Hamas-affiliated Telegram channels claimed that among those arrested were informants, collaborators and those involved in the "assassination of several resistance members".

According to Hamas, the clashes followed the killing of two elite Hamas members and the injuring of five others in an ambush allegedly perpetrated by members of the Doghmush clan, which took the life of the son of Hamas senior commander Basem Naim. A senior source in Gaza's Ministry of Interior told Al-Jazeera that the Doghmush militia members involved in the clashes had ties to Israel.

Group leaders deny the connection between the clan and Israel. Nizar Doghmush, head of the family in Gaza, acknowledged that during the first months of the war, Israel had contacted him to manage a "humanitarian zone", but stated the family refused involvement with either Israel or Hamas, and indicated that the family then became targets for Israeli bombings and raids in late 2023 as retaliation for his refusal.

The Doghmush clan accused Hamas of exploiting the ceasefire with Israel to target its members. A source from Doghmush said that the clan had taken refuge in the building, which had previously served the Jordanian Hospital, after their homes in the al-Sabra neighborhood were destroyed during the Gaza war, and that Hamas sought to evict them in order to establish a new base for its own forces in the area.

Following the attack, Hamas issued a statement through the Gaza Interior Ministry, offering amnesty for collaborators and non-violent members of criminal gangs to surrender during a one-week period beginning 13 October, after which they would face "severe punishment". The Jerusalem Post journalist and expert on Palestinian affairs Khaled Abu Toameh wrote on a social media post that: "Hamas security forces have arrested dozens of suspected collaborators and anti-Hamas clan members since the ceasefire went into effect. Many are expected to be executed, according to Palestinian sources".

On 13 October, in a post on its Facebook page, the Central Council of the Doghmush clan announced that it had sought to dissociate itself from members of the family involved in the fighting against Hamas. It described the "brutal aggression" by the "Israeli occupation", which led to the destruction, exploding and demolishing of the homes of the Doghmsh clan, the deaths of a large group of the Doghmush clan's children (with children referring to actual children and young clansmen), and the injuring of many people with multiple going missing. The Central Council also apologized to the Akl family and dissociated from the Doghmush clansmen who had killed Muhammad Akl.

On 14 October, video footage emerged that appeared to show Hamas militants carrying out a summary execution of at least eight people whose arms are tied behind their backs. Hamas said in a statement, that the people executed were "criminals and collaborators with Israel". In a Facebook post a member of the Doghmush clan said the executions were a "criminal" act.

On 15 October, FDD'S Long War Journal reported that, citing from an unverified Facebook post, claims that the Arrow Unit killed clan members. The poster claimed that female members had been killed with fabricated charges. An unverified account on X claimed that the Arrow Unit killed a woman named Jalal Doghmush and her son, Khalil Doghmush.

== See also ==
- Palestinian internal political violence
- October 2025 Gaza ceasfire
- October 2025 Hamas raid in Khan Yunis
- Hamas–Popular forces conflict
