= Societal breakdown in the Gaza Strip during the Gaza war =

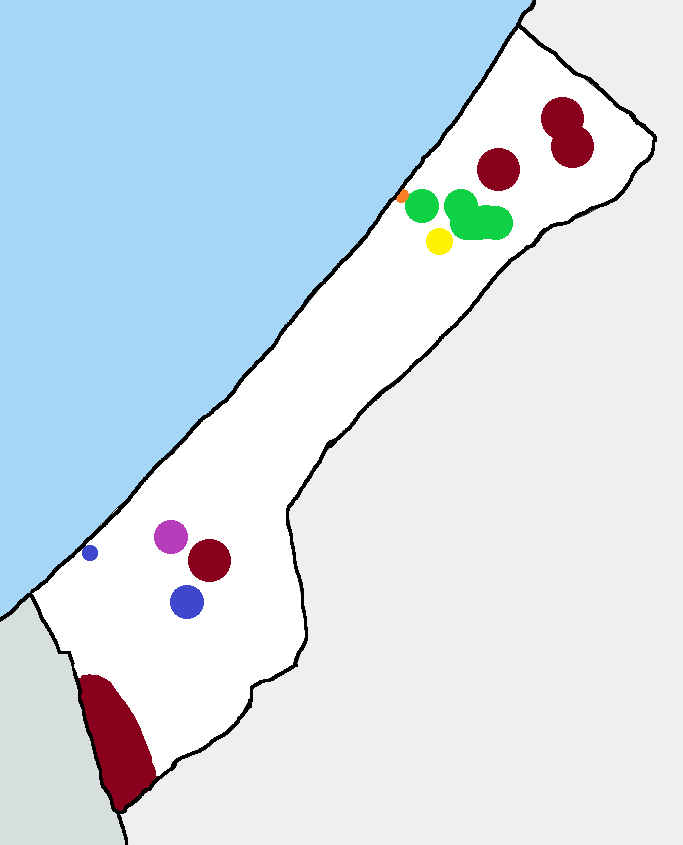
Areas of influence of anti-Hamas factions in the Gaza Strip in October 2025: Popular Forces (including the Popular Army – Northern Forces and Popular Army in Rafah) Counter-Terrorism Strike Force Shuja'iyya Popular Defense Forces Gaza Strip under Hamas and State of Israel Doghmush clan Khanidak clan Abu Werda clan

During the Gaza war, societal and institutional breakdown occurred across the Gaza Strip caused by continual military assaults by the Israel Defense Forces (IDF) on Palestinian law enforcement institutions as well as widespread starvation, famine, and lack of essential supplies created by the conflict and blockade of the Gaza Strip. Due to significant destabilization caused by military conflict and the ongoing Gaza humanitarian crisis, the United Nations reported in July 2024 that significant increases in looting, killing of law enforcement and humanitarian workers expanded across the Gaza Strip, and were emblematic of greater societal breakdown and spreading "anarchy" throughout the enclave.

Furthermore, with the Hamas government losing control over most of Gaza as the war progressed, a variety of armed groups emerged, with at least some being backed by Israel. +972 Magazine described Gaza as undergoing an "engineered disintegration — one in which Israel actively cultivates Gaza's collapse by empowering criminal militias, fragmenting authority, and dismantling every pillar of Palestinian social infrastructure." Following the October 2025 ceasefire, which involved an IDF withdrawal from roughly half of Gaza, internal violence escalated as Hamas began efforts to reassert control over its portion of the territory. Nonetheless, by 21 October, the IDF evaluated that the group had effectively reestablished political and security control over its half of Gaza.

According to an October 2025 report by ACLED, more than 220 intra-Palestinian violent incidents have occurred since October 2023, resulting in the deaths of around 400 Palestinians. Furthermore, the report states that looting of aid, theft, and violent activity by gangs, clans, and armed groups have become widespread, and that 70% of these incidents have occurred after Israel broke the 2025 ceasefire with its attacks in March.

== Background ==
Following the October 7 attacks, Israel announced on 9 October that it was blocking the entry of food into Gaza. The blockage, according to the Israeli government, is aimed to neutralize Hamas as a security threat, including preventing military resources from being smuggled under the guise of humanitarian aid. Because Gaza was already mostly reliant on food aid, the repercussions were felt immediately.

In late June 2024 a leaked UN document said that 95% of the population of Gaza were in food insecurity, while almost 500,000 were facing near-famine hunger. The report found famine remained a possibility throughout the entirety of the Gaza Strip, and that the risk was "as high" as at any other time during the conflict. The UN stated one in five households went entire days without eating.

Conflict and humanitarian researchers stated that the collapse of Gazan social order was a deliberate consequence of Israeli military destabilization to force life to be "unbearable" for its citizens.

== Societal breakdown ==
On 19 June 2024 the Office of the United Nations High Commissioner for Human Rights (OHCHR) reported the expansion and escalation of "anarchy" throughout the Gaza Strip as a result of the humanitarian crisis caused by the war, leading to documented "rampant looting, unlawful killings and shootings" of "local police and humanitarian workers". The head of the agency's Gaza and West Bank Ajith Sunghay stated that the significant increase in lawlessness was a result of "Israel's dismantling of local capacity to maintain public order and safety in Gaza". The agency further reported on multiple instances of "mob justice, extortion of money, family disputes, random shootings, fighting for space and resources", and "youths armed with sticks manning barricades".

=== Looting of aid ===
The blockade and resulting lack of essential goods resulted in several instances of desperate citizens looting aid trucks. Many large families armed themselves with light weapons to facilitate raids on humanitarian convoys, blocking law enforcement from preventing looting. The lack of formal police protection led to many humanitarian truck drivers signing informal deals with armed citizens to protect their cargo from looting.

In December 2023 several knife-wielding masked individuals raided a UNRWA flour distribution site at the Tal al-Sultan neighborhood in Rafah, causing police to shoot at and kill one of the attackers. The victim's family blocked streets and set tires on fire in Rafah in retaliation, before attacking the UNRWA flour distribution site and a police station.

In February 2024 The Wall Street Journal reported that lawlessness in Gaza was hindering aid efforts. Axios reported that armed gangs have been attacking and looting aid trucks since Hamas police have quit due to Israeli attacks. A Palestine Red Crescent Society spokesman stated that the civil disorder "contributed to around a 50 percent decrease in the total number of aid trucks entering Gaza in February" and an Egyptian aid truck driver described people climbing and smashing aid trucks. In the middle of February, a Bedouin boy was shot during a confrontation where several citizens raided an aid truck to take its cargo. Dozens of the boy's family members retaliated by storming the Rafah Border Crossing courtyard and setting car tires on fire.

Several countries including the United States initiated airdrops of humanitarian aid and food to mitigate famine, which resulted in several confrontations between desperate citizens trying to gather aid from the boxes in addition to several fatal injuries caused by falling aid boxes. Salama Marouf, the head of Gaza's media office, characterized the air drops as "humiliating and demeaning".

In June 2024 The New York Times reported that relief groups had stopped delivering aid to southern Gaza due to looting and attacks from armed gangs, with aid trucks being peppered by bullet holes on supply routes. Both commercial and aid agencies decided that they could not risk employees' lives. One aid worker described the daily attacks from armed criminal gangs in the Israel-Gaza border area as being coordinated and organized. The worker said that sometimes the aid truck drivers were beaten. AP News spoke with an UN official who described thousands of aid trucks piled up, armed groups regularly obstructing convoys, and drivers being held at gunpoint. A worker at a Palestinian trucking company said that aid was spoiling in the hot weather. To try to make up for the aid deficiency, Israel allowed more commercial trucks into Gaza from Israel and the Israeli-occupied West Bank, which unlike UN convoys, usually travel with armed protection. One Gazan businessman said that in the past he paid thousands of dollars to other Gazans to protect his trucks. An Al-Azhar University associate professor of political science said the lawlessness resulted from increasing desperation and the resulting power vacuum left from Hamas' decreasing power over Gaza.

In late June the UN warned that it would suspend aid operations in Gaza unless Israel increased efforts to protect humanitarian workers. A State Department spokesman said that in June, looting and other criminal attacks were the largest barriers to delivering aid, rather than Israeli strikes or Hamas' commandeering of aid convoys. In July, the UN said that they would be bringing in more personal safety equipment and armored vehicles following approval from Israeli officials.

On 16 November 2024, the Popular Forces carried out an attack on aid convoys at the Kerem Shalom border crossing, described by UNRWA as one of the worst instances of looting during the war.

=== Looting of banks ===
In June 2024, the UN estimated that armed gangs (which include those backed by Hamas), have stolen over $120 million from northern Gaza banks in two months.

=== Law enforcement ===
Due to persistent attacks on law enforcement by Israeli troops, the majority of Gaza's police force stopped wearing uniforms to avoid being targeted, leading to greater instances of lawlessness due to the apparent lack of police presence in many areas.

== Anti-Hamas armed groups ==
Various armed factions have emerged to challenge Hamas amidst a widespread societal collapse and power vacuum. As of 30 September, up to a dozen new armed groups opposed to Hamas have emerged in Gaza.

In the days leading up to the October 2025 ceasefire, Palestinians linked to anti-Hamas armed groups reportedly began fearing persecution ahead of the withdrawal of Israeli troops. According to Israel Hayom, some Israeli intelligence officers advocated limited evacuation for "high-risk collaborators", but the army command blocked the idea, arguing that any organised extraction could inflame local anger and create political fallout.

The total strength of Israeli-backed anti-Hamas Palestinian militias in the Gaza strip is estimated to be around 3,000 total fighters across the entire strip.

=== Popular Forces ===
The Popular Forces, founded by Yasser Abu Shabab, is an Israeli-backed group that operates in the southern Gaza Strip. They presently control eastern Rafah, have freedom of movement throughout the wider Israeli-controlled Rafah area, and have expanded into Khan Yunis.

The group is also allegedly linked to the Islamic State (IS); this has been claimed by members of the Israeli opposition as well as by Hamas. Popular Forces commanders Issam al-Nabahin and Ghassan al-Dahini were formerly in the Sinai Province branch of IS and the Gazan IS affiliate Jaysh al-Islam, respectively.

Abu Shabab has described his group's operations as a humanitarian project, saying that "hundreds of families" are evacuating to areas under Popular Forces control daily to escape "war and famine".

The Popular Forces first emerged in May 2024 at the beginning of Israel's Rafah offensive. They have been responsible for the Kerem Shalom aid convoy looting and allegedly participated in massacres of civilians during aid distributions by the Israeli-backed Gaza Humanitarian Foundation (GHF).

==== Counter-Terrorism Service ====
The Counter-Terrorism Service is the Popular Forces' armed wing, the CTS was led by the Deputy Commander of the Popular Forces, Ghassan Duhine, until Yasser Abu Shabab's death in an ambush in December 2025.

==== Popular Army – Northern Forces ====
The Popular Army – Northern Forces or People's Army – Northern Forces is active in the northern Gaza Strip and operates as part of the Popular Forces. The militia is led by the Gaza City resident Ashraf al-Mansi. Following the 10 October ceasefire, Hamas forces redeployed in Jabalia and its refugee camp, where they reportedly launched a crackdown on the al-Mansi group, arresting and killing its members. However, on 14 October, al-Mansi released a video where he denied that a Hamas crackdown had taken place, announced that his group managed to take control of several areas in northern Gaza, and warned Hamas forces against approaching their territories.

==== Free Homeland Forces ====
Shawqi Abu Nasira, a former Palestinian Authority lieutenant colonel and Fatah member, leads an anti-Hamas militia based in eastern Khan Yunis. While the existence of the group was only revealed in late November 2025, it had reportedly already been active for several months. Abu Nasira has stated that his group is not collaborating with Israel, and has stated that Iran, which supports Hamas, is the enemy "of Islam and Sunnis". The rest of the Abu Nasira family has disavowed him.

During the 1980s, Abu Nasira was reportedly imprisoned by Israel for militant activity, and briefly escaped from prison. Following his release and the implementation of the Oslo Accords, he joined the nascent Palestinian Authority security forces. Abu Nasira's son was reportedly killed during the Gaza war by Hamas, which led to him opposing Hamas.

=== Fatah-affiliated groups and clans ===
==== Counter-Terrorism Strike Force ====
The Counter-Terrorism Strike Force (CTSF), which is reportedly linked to the IDF and the Shin Bet, declared its formation on 21 August 2025, stating it aims to combat the "repression and terrorism practised by Hamas". It is based in the village of Kizan al-Najjar, just south of Khan Yunis. The CTSF and the Popular Forces are reportedly in contact with one another but work independently. CTSF leadership appears to consist largely of figures affiliated with Fatah, primarily from al-Astal's extended family.

The group is led by Husam al-Astal, a Palestinian Bedouin who worked in Israel and then worked for the Palestinian Authority security forces when they still controlled Gaza. He has spoken favorably about the era of direct Israeli military rule in Gaza prior to the 2005 disengagement. Al-Astal was previously imprisoned and given a death sentence by Hamas for his involvement with Israel, and was accused of involvement in the 2018 assassination of the Hamas-associated engineer Fadi al Batsh in Malaysia.

Astal has linked to Mossad. Before founding the Counter-Terrorism Strike Force, Ynet reported that al-Astal was a member of the Popular Forces.

The CTSF says it operates "within a national framework coordinated with legitimate Palestinian entities" and is committed to upholding international humanitarian law. It also says it has received funding from "honest national businessmen" and Palestinians both domestically and internationally.

==== Khanidak clan ====
The Khanidak clan is led by Yasser Khanidak, a Fatah operative, and operated in Khan Yunis during Israel's 2025 offensive in the city. Ynet reported that the clan is said to be receiving weapons and aid from Israel and salaries from the Palestinian Authority. However, Yasser Khanidak has denied collaboration with Israel or the PA, and said he supports Hamas and its allies. He additionally claimed that his activity was only within the framework of revenge for the killing of two of his brothers by another clan.

==== Shuja'iyya Popular Defense Forces ====
The Shuja'iyya Popular Defense Forces is an Israeli-backed anti-Hamas militant group in the Gaza Strip led and founded by Rami Hilles and Ahmed Jundeya. It operates within the Israeli-controlled side of the Yellow Line, namely in the Shuja'iyya neighborhood of Gaza City, as well as in the adjacent Zaytun and Tuffah neighborhoods. The group is composed of dozens of fighters primarily drawn from the Hilles clan and the Jundeya clan.

The Shuja'iyya Popular Defense Forces was erroneously initially conflated with the entire Hilles clan, but is now known to be a "rogue faction" that has been disavowed by clan leadership.

In October 2025 the Shuja'iyya Popular Defense Forces began to control areas in Shuja'iyya.

==== Abu Khammash and Abu Moghaiseb factions ====
In central Gaza the anti-Hamas Abu Khammash and Abu Moghaiseb families/clans became active around Deir al-Balah before the January 2025 Gaza war ceasefire. Both factions later reemerged in March around the same time the ceasefire was broken by Israel. Law enforcement in the Gaza Strip launched operations against both factions simultaneously and managed to quickly crush both factions during which they had killed and wounded multiple armed clansmen from both factions, before tribal elders were able to broker a ceasefire between the factions and local security forces and later arranged for the surrendering of the clans'/families' weapons.

==== Al-Mujaida clan ====
The Fatah-affiliated Al-Mujaida clan is based in a Khan Yunis neighbourhood of the same name, the Mujaida or Al-Mujaida Quarter, which has been described as its "stronghold".

On 3 October 2025, clashes in Khan Yunis erupted between Gaza Interior Ministry's Arrow Unit and gunmen from Al-Mujaida clan. Hamas said that its forces launched a raid to detain supposed collaborators with Israel. The CTSF said they fought the Hamas forces alongside clan members, with Israeli air support. Ultimately, on 12 October, the clan agreed to hand over unlicensed weapons to Hamas, and affirmed support for them in combating "security chaos". This pledge reportedly came about due to the raid having effectively "decimated" the clan into submission.

==== Abu Samra family ====
A Telegram channel had posted that the Gaza police's Arrow unit had targeted members of the Fatah-affiliated Abu Samra family/clan in Deir al-Balah.

The same channel released a statement warning that, "Any family that does not withdraw its social and tribal cover from members involved in bloodshed, roadblocks, or assaults will be treated as complicit." This statement made by the telegram channel was attributed to a "special source".

=== Other Palestinian clans ===
==== Barbakh clan ====
The Barbakh clan, based in Khan Yunis and Rafah, reportedly opposes both Hamas and Israel. On 17 June 2025 the clan published a video showing armed members escorting Gazan civilians carrying GHF aid packages from Rafah to Khan Yunis. On 26 June, the clan engaged in armed clashes with Hamas forces at the Nasser Hospital in Khan Yunis. However, Hamas later claimed that it retains the support of the Barbakh clan, and that the clan had condemned its members who participated in the hospital battle.

==== Abu Ziyad clan ====
The Abu Ziyad clan is based in the village of Az-Zawayda near Deir al-Balah. In June the clan accused Hamas of killing a clan member who had supposedly tried to prevent the group from stealing humanitarian aid. It has demanded that Hamas hand over the operatives responsible for the killing and has threatened to "go to war" against the group.

==== Abu Werda clan ====
The Abu Werda clan clashed with Hamas forces near the Port of Gaza on 10 October 2025; the battle left three Hamas fighters and two clan members dead, as well as dozens wounded.

==== Doghmush clan ====
The Doghmush clan has historically been hostile to Hamas, and tensions escalated during the Gaza war. In March 2024, clan leader Saleh Doghmush was killed. Israeli news outlets reported that Hamas had clashed with the family during the war and executed Doghmush. The family issued a statement denying the claim.

Later, after the announcement of the 2025 October ceasefire, clashes erupted between the clan and Hamas forces. The clan killed two Hamas members in Gaza City, including the son of a military intelligence head. A day later, Hamas killed a clan member and arrested 30 others. A clan source accused Hamas of having started the conflict by evicting family members from a building where they had taken refuge. One report states that at least 64 people died in the fighting, including 52 Doghmush fighters and 12 Hamas militants, though other sources have reported at least 27 deaths, 19 of whom belong to the Doghmush clan and 8 to Hamas. Each side of the conflict accused the other for the triggering of the clashes.

Some reports from inside Gaza have portrayed the clan as being backed by Israel, but the claims are heavily disputed, with clan leaders denying any collaboration.

In October 2025 the Doghmush clan fought Hamas in Tel al-Hawa. The Doghmush clan also clashed with Hamas in Sabra in October 2025.

== Hamas-backed armed groups and clans ==
=== Arrow Unit ===
The Arrow Unit or Sahm Unit is a special police unit of the Gaza Interior Ministry-controlled Palestinian Civil Police Force in the Gaza Strip. It was formed in 2024 during the ongoing Gaza war and has participated in the Hamas–Popular Forces conflict. It aims to promote internal stability and is primarily involved in pursuing looters and collaborators with Israel. It often carries out extrajudicial executions.

The unit originated as informal groups of Gazan youths, led by an unknown police officer, which would deploy to public areas often subject to unrest, such as bread lines, ATMs, and markets. News reports at the time frequently described them arresting suspected thieves and beating them severely in marketplaces, publicly proclaiming that this was the punishment for looters.

The Ministry of Internal Affairs in the Gaza Strip officially adopted the unit in March 2024, with the objectives of promoting internal stability and cooperating with local tribal committees to protect aid convoys. Police officers, members of the Al-Qassam Brigades, and members of local tribes joined the Arrow Unit's ranks.

=== Rad'a Force ===
On 27 July 2025, a relatively new Palestinian law enforcement and security force, "Quwwat al-Rad'a", executed six Popular Forces militants in Khan Yunis. The Popular Forces denied any of its members had been attacked. Quwwat al-Rad'a translates to "the deterrence force" in English.

After the ceasefire deal came into effect on 10 October 2025, the Rad'a Force began patrolling in Gaza City together with officers from the Gaza Strip's Palestinian Civil Police Force.

=== Abu Suneima family ===
Members of the Abu Suneima family shouted pro-Hamas slogans, during their attack against former Popular Forces leader Yasser Abu Shabab.

== Stabilization efforts ==
Several initiatives arose to try and maintain order in regions where Hamas withdrew, some of whom cooperated with the Israel Defense Forces. Law enforcement shifted to more "improvisational" strategies towards resolving interpersonal issues between citizens, regulating traffic, and keeping the peace at markets and public spaces. Law enforcement also implemented strategies to improve effective humanitarian aid distribution such as assisting distribution, fending off looters or desperate citizens, and working to prevent rapid price increases for market goods. Large families assisted with food and aid distribution in collaboration with aid convoys.

Several Palestinian factions hosted by Hamas, the Popular Front for the Liberation of Palestine (PFLP), and Palestinian Islamic Jihad worked with regional clans and families to create protection committees to maintain security, help with regulating markets, preventing overcrowding around aid trucks, and preventing looting or uncoordinated aid delivery. Many members of these committed were masked men armed with heavy sticks or automatic firearms, with some committees including children on active duty.

During the war, Hamas killed and maimed people who they said were looters.

=== After the October 2025 ceasefire ===
Following the ceasefire in the Gaza Strip on 10 October, Hamas internal security forces began killing and arresting members of rival armed groups throughout the territory. Hamas recalled 7,000 of its security and police forces to reassert control of the Strip. Since the ceasefire began, anti-Hamas factions have maintained a lower profile.

On 11 October, it was reported that Hamas forces redeployed in Jabalia and its refugee camp, where they launched a violent crackdown on the Ashraf al-Mansi group, arresting and killing its members.

On 12 October, news reported that Hamas encircled the neighbourhood of the Doghmush family, killing several family members and deploying a large group of masked, armed men around Gaza City's Jordanian hospital. The clashes between Hamas and the Dughmush family killed 27 people.

By 21 October, the IDF evaluated that Hamas had reestablished political and security control in its portion of Gaza down to the municipal level and had effectively eliminated rival armed groups west of the Yellow Line.
