= Free Homeland Forces =

Israeli-backed Palestinian militia

- قوات الوطن الحر
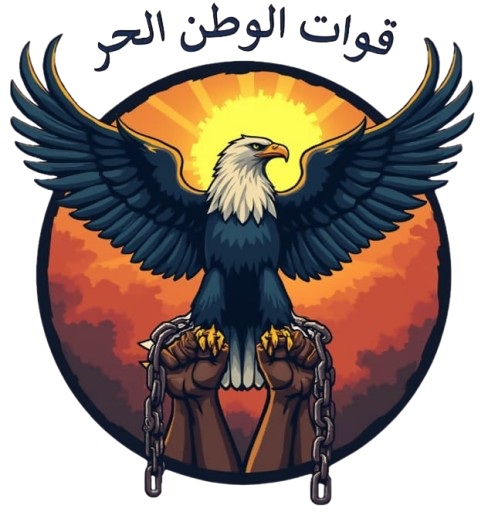
- Other name: Popular Army in Rafah
- Leader: Shawqi Abu Nasira
- Dates active: 1 September, 2025 — present
- Country: Palestine
- Allegiance: Popular Forces administration
- Headquarters: Al Azmi Basic Co-education school
- Active regions: Rafah and Khan Yunis
- Ideology: Anti-Hamas
- Status: Active
- Size: ~30
- Part of: Popular Forces
- Wars: Gaza war; Hamas–Popular Forces conflict; Israeli attacks on Al-Maghazi refugee camp

The Free Homeland Forces (Arabic: قوات الوطن الحر, romanized: al-Quwwat al-Watan al-Hu'r), also known as the Popular Army in Rafah (Arabic: الجيش الشعبي في رفح, romanized: Al-Jaysh al-Shaabi fi Rafah) is an anti-Hamas Palestinian militant group led by Shawqi Abu Nasira, a former Palestinian Authority officer. His group reportedly operates as part of the Popular Forces and is composed of around 30 fighters. His group is headquartered in the Masadaa Ibn Abed Allah Al Azmi Basic Co-education school in Eastern Khan Yunis, though it operates in both Rafah and Khan Yunis. The existence of the group was only revealed in late November 2025, however it has been active since 1 September, 2025.

== Background and history ==
=== Shawqi Abu Nasira ===
Shawqi Abu Nasira is a former Palestinian Authority Lieutenant Colonel and Fatah member. During the 1980s, Abu Nasira was reportedly imprisoned for 16 years by Israel for militant activity, and briefly escaped from prison. Following his release and the implementation of the Oslo Accords, he joined the Palestinian Authority security forces. One of Abu Nasira's sons was reportedly killed during the Gaza war by Hamas for criticizing Hamas, which led to him opposing Hamas.

=== Societal breakdown in Gaza ===
During the course of the Gaza war, societal breakdown across the Gaza Strip led to famine and a lack of supplies causing a weaker Hamas, resulting in the rise of anti-Hamas armed elements in the Gaza Strip.

== Relations ==
Abu Nasira has stated that his group is not collaborating with Israel, and has stated that Iran, which supports Hamas, is the enemy "of Islam and Sunnis". The rest of the Abu Nasira family has disavowed him.

Abu Nasira's group operates within the portion of Gazan territory under Israeli military control. In an interview with Israeli television in December 2025, Abu Nasira said, "The relationship between us and the Israelis is a strong relationship and an intimate friendship, and we will live with them for the rest of our lives in security and peace….They provide us with weapons, food, and clothing, and we coordinate with them on security to the fullest extent."

Compared to the rest of the Popular Forces, Abu Nasira's group has displayed greater willingness to work with Israel. The group operates more boldly than other anti-Hamas groups in Gaza and its members speak fluent Hebrew when speaking with Israeli media. Abu Nasira's group has presented itself as a potential alternative to Hamas's rule in Gaza more often than other groups.

Abu Nasira claims that he is in contact with other anti-Hamas militant groups on establishing a united front called the "National Guard for East Gaza".

== Operations ==
While the existence of the group was only revealed in late November 2025, it had reportedly already been active for several months. The FHF/PAR reportedly operates as part of the Popular Forces and is composed of around 30 fighters.

On 14 December, the Popular Forces claimed responsibility for the assassination of 49-year-old Lieutenant Colonel Ahmed Zamzam, who was a key member in Gaza's Internal Security Apparatus. Zamzam was gunned down by armed men in the Maghazi refugee camp, with one of the men being arrested. The Gaza Interior Ministry-affiliated Rad'a force claimed the Zamzam had been killed by "Israeli-supported" mercenaries under direct guidance from Israel’s Shin Bet. An investigation by Asharq Al-Awsat had found that the assassination was carried out by members of Shawqi Abu Nasira's group.

In April 2026, the Free Homeland Forces raided the Maghazi refugee camp near Deir al-Balah in Gaza searching for Hamas fighters while the Israeli military provided air support. The militia killed at least ten people and wounded many more.

== Hamas response ==
=== Raid on Abu Nasira's home ===
On 22 December 2025, a unit of the Gaza police known as the Sahm 103 unit or Arrow Unit, which specialises in targeting collaborators with Israel, said on its Telegram channel that it had detained Abu Nasira's wife and son.

Abu Nasira accused Hamas of having raided his house, abducted his wife and stolen money, a gas canister, and solar panels. "I don't know if this is a rule of law or of larceny", Abu Nasira said in an interview on 23 December 2025 with Jusoor News, a pan-Arab, anti-Hamas media outlet.

The Sahm unit also state that Abu Nasira's family members had 700,000 Israeli shekels ($220,000 at the time) in their possession.
