= Fata =

Fata or FATA may refer to:

== People ==
- Arthur Fata (born 1963), Zimbabwean sculptor
- Rico Fata (born 1980), Canadian ice-hockey player
- Drew Fata (born 1983), Canadian ice-hockey player, brother of Rico
- Farid Fata (born 1965), American oncologist convicted of large-scale medical fraud
- Fata Orlović (born 1942), Bosniak woman involved in land lawsuit
- Fata Omanović (born 1883), Bosniak historical figure
- Fata Salkunič (born 1991), Slovenian footballer
- Fata-a-iki (died 1896), king of Niue
- Fata Sini (born 1966), Samoan rugby footballer

== Places ==
- Federally Administered Tribal Areas, a semi-autonomous tribal region in northwestern Pakistan 1947–2018
  - FATA Development Authority
  - Federally Administered Tribal Areas cricket team
  - FATA University
- Fata Kot Taja, Bhawana Tehsil, Pakistan
- Fata, Vedea, Argeș, Romania

== Other uses ==
- Dalmat (yacht), which carried the name Fata between 1941 and 1943
- From Autumn to Ashes, an American post-hardcore band
- FATA (hard disk drive)
- Federal Air Transport Agency, of Russia

== See also ==
- Fatah, a Palestinian political party
- Faţa (disambiguation)
- Fate (disambiguation)
- Fata Morgana (disambiguation)
