= 2025 Khan Yunis offensive =

2025 Israeli offensive during the Gaza war

- Part of Operation Gideon's Chariots (until 4 August 2025), the Israeli invasion of the Gaza Strip during the Gaza war, the Hamas–Popular Forces conflict, and the Fatah–Hamas conflict
Date	26 May – 10 October 2025 (1 year, 5 months, 3 weeks and 4 days)
Location	Khan Yunis, southern Gaza Strip
Result	Ceasefire and Israeli withdrawal from parts of Khan Yunis

Belligerents
Israel; Israeli-backed groups: (Palestine) Popular Forces; Fatah-affiliated groups; Al-Mujaida clan; Counter-Terrorism Strike Force	Hamas; Palestinian Islamic Jihad; Popular Front for the Liberation of Palestine	(Fatah) Khanidak clan (Note: Ynet reported that the Khanidak clan is said to be receiving weapons and aid from Israel as well as salaries from the Palestinian Authority. However, the clan's leader, Yasser Khanidak (who is also a Fatah operative), has denied collaboration with Israel or the Palestinian Authority, and said he supports Hamas and its allies. He additionally claimed that his activity was only within the framework of revenge for the killing of two of his brothers by another clan.); Barbakh clan (Note: The Barbakh clan is reportedly opposed to both Hamas and Israel. However, Hamas claims that the clan is their ally and that only rogue clan members have fought against the group.)

Commanders and leaders
(Israel) Yaniv Asor (Israel) Moran Omer (Israel) Guy Levy (Israel) Miki Sharvit (Israel) Yaniv Barot (Israel) Adi Ganon (Israel) Noam Sovel (Palestine) Yasser Abu Shabab (Palestine) Hossam al-Astal	(Hamas) Izz al-Din al-Haddad (Hamas) Muhammad Abu Shamala X	(Fatah) Yasser Khanidak; Unknown Barbakh clan leader

Units involved
Israel Defense Forces; Israeli Ground Forces; 36th Division; 900th Brigade; Golani Brigade; 98th Paratroopers Division; 35th Paratroopers Brigade; 7th Armored Brigade; 82nd Armored Battalion; Israeli Air Force; (Palestine) Popular Forces administration; Counter-Terrorism Service; (Palestine) CTSF administration; Counter-Terrorism Strike Force	(Palestine) Palestinian Joint Operations Room; (Hamas) Al-Qassam Brigades; Khan Yunis Brigade; (Palestinian Islamic Jihad) Al-Quds Brigades; (Popular Front for the Liberation of Palestine) Abu Ali Mustafa Brigades; Palestinian Police; Sahm Unit (Arrow unit)	Armed clansmen

The 2025 Khan Yunis offensive was a major military engagement that began on 26 May 2025 as part of the broader Israeli offensive in the Gaza Strip launched in May 2025, known as Operation Gideon's Chariots, during the ongoing Gaza war. It marked the fourth time that Israel invaded Khan Yunis since the beginning of the war.

Following weeks of operations in Rafah, the Israel Defense Forces (IDF) launched a renewed incursion into Khan Yunis. The operation targeted Hamas fighters, positions, infrastructure, and tunnel networks in the city. Several local anti-Hamas armed groups also involved themselves in the fighting.

Following the implementation of a ceasefire on 10 October 2025, the offensive stopped and Israeli forces withdrew from parts of Khan Yunis.

== Background ==
The IDF previously invaded Khan Yunis in December 2023, with the resulting battle and siege lasting until April 2024. Two later Israeli incursions into the city took place in July and in August 2024.

In May 2025, Israel launched Operation Gideon's Chariots, a renewed campaign focused on eliminating remaining Hamas forces in Gaza.

== Battle ==
=== May ===
On 26 May 2025, the IDF initiated a renewed ground offensive into Khan Yunis as part of Operation Gideon's Chariots, following intense airstrikes across Southern Gaza.

On 29 May, Israeli combat engineers completed a major operation to neutralize a Hamas tunnel network on the outskirts of Khan Yunis. According to an official IDF report, troops located and dismantled a lengthy "offensive" underground terror tunnel stretching several hundred meters.

On 30 May, the IDF announced that the Kfir Brigade, under the command of the 36th Division, were joining the operation in Khan Yunis.

=== June ===
On 6 June, Palestinian militants killed five Israeli soldiers in an ambush east of Khan Yunis, that involved a building rigged with an explosive which collapsed and killed the soldiers.

On 9 June, the IDF completed the capture of all of eastern Khan Yunis.

On 12 June, the Gaza Humanitarian Foundation (GHF) reported that a bus carrying about two dozen Palestinian GHF workers was attacked by Hamas while on its way to a distribution center near Khan Yunis. The attack killed at least eight people and caused multiple injuries. Hamas said that the aid workers were in reality members of the Popular Forces.

On 24 June, seven Israeli soldiers operating in Khan Yunis were killed after a Hamas fighter climbed onto their APC and hurled a Shawaz EFP into the vehicle’s hatch.

On 26 June, the Barbakh clan, which reportedly opposes both Hamas and Israel, engaged in armed clashes with Hamas forces at the Nasser Hospital in Khan Yunis.

On 27 June, Popular Forces militants reportedly seized control of the Nasser Hospital after a gunbattle with Hamas forces.

=== July ===
On 3 July, Ynet reported that the Fatah-affiliated Khanidak clan, led by Yasser Khanidak, was operating in Khan Yunis and was being armed by Israel. Yasser Khanidak denied any collaboration with Israel.

On 9 July, Palestinian militants attempted to abduct an Israeli soldier in Khan Yunis, who resisted and was then killed.

=== August ===
On 20 August, 14 Al-Qassam Brigades gunmen attacked an Israeli military post in Khan Yunis near the Morag Corridor, likely in an attempt to abduct soldiers. Israeli forces exchanged gunfire with the attackers and reportedly killed between eight and ten gunmen while others retreated. Three IDF soldiers were injured in the attack. The fighters also managed to snipe the commander of a Merkava tank, fatally wounding them. Israeli media referred to it as a “rare” attack that managed to “penetrate the defenses” of the Nahshon Battalion of the army’s Kfir Brigade.

On 25 August, the IDF launched air strikes on the Nasser Hospital, killing 22 civilians, including five journalists.

=== October ===
On 3 October, clashes in Khan Yunis erupted between Hamas' Arrow Unit and gunmen from the Fatah-aligned al-Mujaida clan. Hamas stated its forces launched a raid to detain supposed collaborators with Israel. Hamas forces reportedly killed 5 members of the clan, and armed clan members reportedly killed 11 Hamas men. The Counter-Terrorism Strike Force (CSF), a local anti-Hamas armed group, said its men fought the Hamas forces alongside clan members, with Israeli air support. The situation deescalated following the mediation of local elders and an exchange of deceased bodies.

== Aftermath ==
Israeli forces withdrew from parts of Khan Yunis on 10 October following the implementation of a ceasefire in the Gaza Strip. Dozens of Palestinian civilians returned to their homes in and around Khan Yunis. Other crowds of Palestinians in the city who had been displaced from northern Gaza began trekking back to their homes.

== See also ==
- 2025 Nasser Hospital strikes
- 2025 Shuja'iyya offensive
- 2025 Beit Hanoun offensive and siege
- 2025 Gaza City offensive
