= Anti-Hamas insurgency in the Gaza Strip =

Ongoing civil conflict in the Gaza Strip

- Part of Palestinian internal political violence and Societal breakdown in the Gaza Strip during the Gaza war
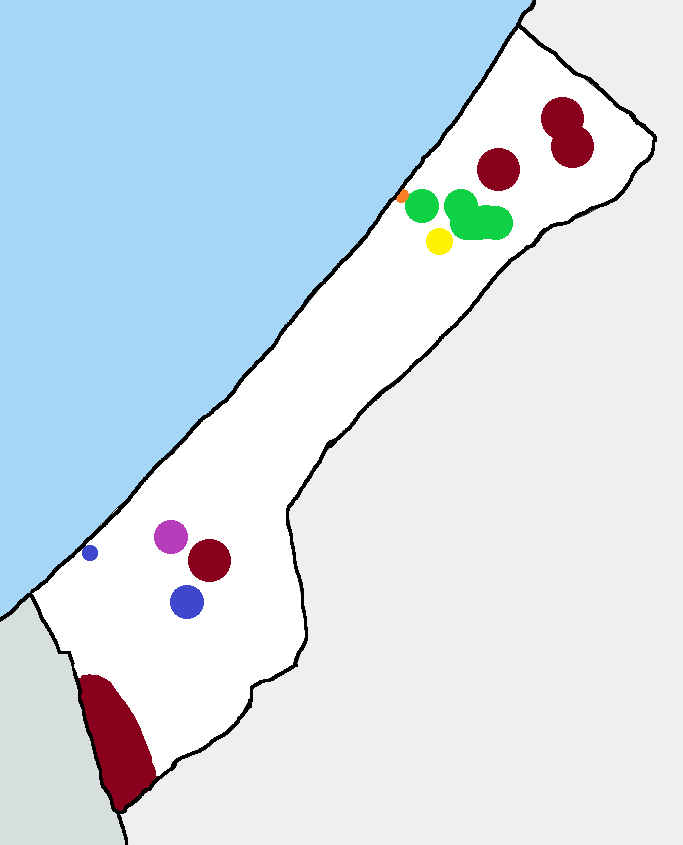
- Popular Forces (including the Popular Army – Northern Forces and Popular Army in Rafah) Counter-Terrorism Strike Force Shuja'iyya Popular Defense Forces Gaza Strip under Hamas and State of Israel Doghmush clan Khanidak clan Abu Werda clan
Date	May 2024 – present
Location	Gaza Strip, Palestine
Status	Ongoing: Hamas presence in Rafah is weakened after the Rafah offensive in 2024 with Al-Bayuk coming under the Popular Forces' control; 2025 Hamas–Doghmush conflict and 2025 Hamas executions; The Popular Forces' leader is assassinated by the Abu Suneima family; 2026 Maghazi refugee camp raid
Territorial changes	Eastern Rafah and eastern Khan Yunis come under the control of the Popular Forces; the Ashraf al-Mansi group claims control over parts of northern Gaza as of 14 October 2025

Belligerents
(Popular Forces) Anti-Hamas insurgents; Israel	Hamas-led government; / (Fatah) Pro-Hamas clans/families

Commanders and leaders
Popular Forces: Yasser Abu Shabab X; Ghassan Duhine (WIA); Issam Nabahin; Hassan Abu Shabab; Ahmad Zidan Al-Tarabeen (executed); Khaled Abu Sanida; PANF: Ashraf al-Mansi; Abu Anas Zeidan; FHF: Shawqi Abu Nasira; CTSF: Husam al-Astal; SPDF: Rami Hilles; Ahmed Jundeya; Khanidak clan: Yasser Khanidak (until October 2025)	Hamas: Khalil al-Hayya; Mohammed Odeh X; Izz al-Din al-Haddad X; Ahmed Zamzam X; Adham Atallah al-Akar (POW); Muhammad Abu Shaleh X; Iyad Abu Yousif X

Units involved
Popular Forces administration; Popular Forces; Counter-Terrorism Service; Popular Army – Northern Forces; Free Homeland Forces; Popular Defense Forces – Khalil al-Wazir Battalion; Shuja'iyya Popular Defense Forces administration; Shuja'iyya Popular Defense Forces; Counter-Terrorism Strike Force administration; Counter-Terrorism Strike Force; All-female police unit; Abu Khammash (surrendered); Abu Moghaiseb (surrendered); Al-Mujaida clan (surrendered); Khanidak clan; Abu Samra clan; Israel Defense Forces; Israeli Ground Forces; Israeli Air Force; Israeli Intelligence community; Shin Bet; Mossad; Doghmush clan; Abu Werda clan	Hamas Government; Palestinian Joint Operations Room; Al-Qassam Brigades; North Brigade; Gaza Brigade; Shuja'iyya Battalion; Rafah Brigade; Khan Yunis Brigade; Ministry of Interior; Palestinian Civil Police Force; Arrow Unit; Intervention Police; Internal Security Services; Rad'a Force; (Palestine) Abu Suneima family

Strength
/ 3,000 fighters	/ Unknown

Casualties and losses
70+ militants killed (Note: Sources:)	~16 policemen and fighters killed
- 15 Palestinian civilians killed

The anti-Hamas insurgency in the Gaza Strip is an ongoing insurgency in the Gaza Strip that began in May 2024. It involves clashes between the Hamas-led government and the anti-Hamas militant groups in Gaza, some of which are backed by Israel's Mossad and affiliated with Fatah.

== Background ==
The Popular Forces is a Palestinian anti-Hamas armed group active in the Gaza Strip and led by Yasser Abu Shabab. The Popular Forces are Israeli-backed and allegedly IS-linked.

The group, which has been described as a gang or militia, is made up of approximately 300 men who operate in eastern Rafah and eastern Khan Yunis. A semi-independent militia in the northern Gaza Strip, led by Ashraf al-Mansi, also reportedly operates as part of the Popular Forces. Israeli support for the Popular Forces was only revealed in June 2025, but the group has been active since the beginning of the Rafah offensive in May 2024.

Husam al-Astal, leader of the Counter-Terrorism Strike Force, an Israeli-backed militant group in the Gaza Strip, claims the support of a variety of other anti-Hamas Gazan militias including the Popular Forces, the Popular Army – Northern Forces and the Popular Defense Forces to work towards "Project New Gaza".

== Timeline ==
=== 2024 ===
==== May ====
The start of Israel's Rafah offensive in May 2024 marked the beginning of Popular Forces activity.

==== June ====
The Popular Forces launched an attack on a Hamas facility located inside the Khan Yunis University College of Applied Sciences. This is the Popular Forces' first notable attack.

==== September ====
In September 2024, Hamas attempted to ambush and assassinate Abu Shabab by firing approximately 90 bullets at a vehicle they thought belonged to him. The vehicle actually belonged to Islam Hijazi, a female aid worker of charity organization named Heal Palestine, she was mistakenly killed in this incident.

==== November ====
On 16 November 2024, Israeli-backed Popular Forces raided a convoy of 109 United Nations aid trucks and looted 98 of them. The raid occurred near Israeli military installations at the Kerem Shalom border crossing in the Gaza Strip. The perpetrators, who according to a UN memo may have had "protection" from the IDF, threw grenades and held truck drivers at gunpoint, forcing them to unload their aid. The incident further exacerbated the Gaza humanitarian crisis caused by the war. The incident has been described by the UNRWA as "one of the worst" incidents of its kind.

On 18 November, a Hamas security unit reported they carried out a "military operation" against the looters in Khan Yunis and Rafah, killing at least 20 of the perpetrators. Abu Shabab was not in the area at the time, but his brother was killed.

=== 2025 ===
==== January ====
In Dier al-Balah, two small armed groups the Abu Khammash and Abu Moghaiseb factions were formed.

In January, Hamas executed one of Abu Shabab's senior aides.

==== March ====
In Dier al-Balah, Hamas clashed with the Abu Khammash and Abu Moghaiseb factions, killing and wounding several members, both factions later surrendered.

==== April ====
On the afternoon of 13 April, 2025, a group of Popular Forces members were ambushed by Hamas fighters in southern Rafah, while searching a property south of their camp, during which four of their fighters were killed.

By the following morning of April 14, satellite imagery showed that the house at the site of the ambush was destroyed by an Israeli airstrike.

==== May ====
In May 2025, the Popular Forces were reported to be securing aid convoys, including vehicles of the United Nations and the Red Cross. Hamas accused Abu Shabab of being a collaborator with Israel, claiming his group operated behind earth berms securing humanitarian entry routes under an American humanitarian aid initiative. According to reports, his forces were escorting convoys from the Kerem Shalom crossing, armed with AK-47 rifles allegedly provided by the Israel Defense Forces (IDF). On 30 May, Hamas published a video which it claimed showed its members targeting undercover IDF soldiers with an IED. Per some Palestinian media reports, the men belonged to the Popular Forces.

==== June ====
On 5 June, Israel revealed it has been backing the Popular Forces. The Israeli opposition legislator Avigdor Lieberman alleged that the Popular Forces is affiliated with IS. In a video published by the militia, Abu Shabab claimed his group was in control of eastern Rafah after expelling Hamas forces.

On June 9, 2025, Popular Forces gunmen together with the IDF were accused of opening fire at a crowd of Palestinians that were walking to an Israel-US supported aid distribution centre run by the Gaza Humanitarian Foundation, killing approximately 6 people. Other sources said that the gunfire killed 14 Palestinians and injured about 100 people. The Associated Press reported that Popular Forces opened fire at a group of men who tried to organize a crowd, causing nearby people to "push forward". One eyewitness said that it "was an ambush", adding: "The Israelis from one side and Abu Shabab from another". This incident was part of a broader series of shootings of Palestinians, which killed approximately 127 people. That same day, Hamas forces ambushed a car transporting Issam Nabahin, capturing him. Nabahin is one of the three Popular Forces commanders, after his capture, Hamas charged him with espionage and murder.

An eyewitness said that on 9 June, the Popular Forces, while in a clash with Hamas fighters, had received air support. He also said that the clashes had continued for an hour and 30 minutes or more hours before the Israeli Air Force intervened and targeted the area, including the area where the witness was.

Sometime during the second week of June, four Hamas fighters were killed in "the first [publicly admitted] Israeli strike on Gaza whose sole objective was to assist the Abu Shabab militia".

On June 10, Popular Forces ambushed a special law enforcement and internal security unit, named the "Arrow Unit", which specializes in executing collaborators with Israel. Popular Forces claimed to have killed 5 Arrow Unit members using anti-aircraft launchers. On June 11, Gaza Humanitarian Foundation reported that a bus transporting its employees was ambushed by Hamas, killing approximately 5 aid workers, leaving others wounded or possibly taken hostage. Hamas would later accuse the victims of the attack of being members of Abu Shabab's militia. That same day, Popular Forces ambushed and killed 6 officers of the Arrow Unit, and the Popular Forces reported that at least 50 of their militants were killed across armed clashes between them and Hamas. Also on that day, an Israeli drone bombed Issam Nabahin's detention cell and his fate was reported to be "unclear". Then, on 18 June, he posted a video on Facebook confirming he was alive and he stated that he was heading to southern Gaza.

Reuters reported that as of 27 June the group was in control of eastern Rafah and has freedom of movement in the wider Rafah area. Later that day, the Popular Forces seized control of the Nasser Hospital in Khan Yunis after a gunbattle with Hamas forces.

==== July ====
On 2 July, the Hamas-run Ministry of the Interior published a statement ordering the Popular Forces militia leader, Yasser Abu Shabab, to turn himself in and face trial on several charges including charges of treason and collaborating with hostile entities. The order warned that if Shabab did not surrender within 10 days, he would be considered a fugitive and tried in absentia. Popular forces responded in a statement questioning the legitimacy of the court and describing the order as "a sitcom that doesn't frighten us, nor does it frighten any free man with dignity who loves his homeland and its dignity".

On 5 July, the Palestinian Joint Operations Room accused Yasser Abu Shabab of "operating to protect the occupation's interests".

On 6 July, Abu Shabab admitted that the Popular Forces had Israeli backing, a month after Israel first revealed it was supporting the group.

On 27 July, a new Gaza Interior Ministry-affiliated unit, the "Rad'a Force", executed six Popular Forces militants in Khan Yunis. The Popular Forces denied any of its members had been attacked.

==== August ====
By August, Issam Nabahin posted another video on Facebook in a room with a PKM machine gun, stating that he was back in Popular Forces-controlled eastern Rafah after escaping Hamas custody.

==== September ====
On 21 September, a Palestinian official said that Hamas-led authorities have executed three men who allegedly had ties with Abu Shabab after they were accused of collaborating with Israel. The execution took place on a street outside of Al-Shifa Hospital in Gaza City.

On 28 September, a Popular Forces operative was executed by Hamas forces.

==== October ====
Following the ceasefire in the Gaza Strip on 10 October, Hamas forces began killing and arresting members of rival armed groups, including the Popular Forces, throughout the territory. Hamas forces redeployed in Jabalia and its refugee camp, where they reportedly launched a violent crackdown on the local militia led by Ashraf al-Mansi, which reportedly operates as part of the Popular Forces. As of October, Several Fatah-affiliated groups were operating against Hamas in Gaza, namely the Counter-Terrorism Strike Force, the Shuja'iyya Popular Defense Forces, and the Khanidak clan and Al-Mujaida clan.

On 10 October, Hamas executed multiple individuals of the Doghmush clan, who were affiliated to the Popular Forces, on Omar al-Mukhtar Street in the Sabra neighbourhood of Gaza City. This led to violent clashes and confrontations between security forces of the Hamas-led government and Doghmush clansmen. On the same day the Abu Werda clan clashed with Hamas forces near the Port of Gaza on 10 October 2025; the battle left three Hamas fighters and two clan members dead, as well as dozens wounded. The violence didn't die down until mid-to-late October, by which point the elders of the clan had dissociated itself with members of the clan who were involved in the clashes.

On 12 October, the Al-Mujaida clan agreed to hand over its weapons to Hamas, and affirmed support for them in combating "security chaos". This pledge reportedly came about due to the October 2025 Hamas raid in Khan Yunis, which occurred during Israel's 2025 Khan Yunis offensive, having effectively "decimated" the Al-Mujaida clan into submission.

On 13 October, Hamas forces publicly executed Ahmad Zidan al-Tarabin, reportedly responsible for recruiting agents for the Popular Forces.

On 14 October, the al-Mansi group released a video where he denied that a Hamas crackdown had taken place, announced that his group managed to take control of several areas in northern Gaza, and warned Hamas forces against approaching their territories.

On 15 October, the Arrow unit targeted members of the Fatah-affiliated Abu Samra clan in Deir al-Balah.

On 21 October, the Rad'a Force reportedly arrested a number of Popular Forces militants and confiscated equipment in an operation described as "a severe blow" to the group.

==== November ====
On 26 November, Abu Shabab said that four Hamas militants surrendered to his men in Rafah. He also published a video in which one of the militants admit involvements in Hamas activities. A local Gaza channel said that the militants were handed over to the IDF.

In November 2025, a female doctor named Tasneem al-Hams stated that in October 2025, she was abducted by members of the Popular Forces in Khan Yunis before she was handed over to Israeli forces and transferred to Ashkelon. Al-Hams was later released in Khan Yunis on 27 November.

In November 2025, an anti-Hamas group (Free Homeland Forces or Popular Army in Rafah) led by Shawqi Abu Nasira was revealed to be active in Eastern Khan Yunis, Abu Nasira was rejected by his family for allegedly collaborating with the Popular Forces.

==== December ====
On 4 December 2025, the commander of the Popular Forces' military-wing, Ghassan Duhine, reportedly detained Juma Abu Suneima, who one of their members, on the suspicion of diverting food supplies to Hamas militants. Juma’s brother, Mahmoud Abu Suneima, who was responsible for overseeing the distribution of food to the Popular Forces demanded his release. Mahmoud later went to Abu Shabab’s residence to demand Juma’s release. The confrontation escalated into armed violence, during which Mahmoud opened fire. Abu Shabab was critically wounded during the encounter. The attacker allegedly chanted pro-Hamas slogans. Leader of the Popular Forces, Yasser Abu Shabab, succumbed to his wounds while being transported to the Soroka Medical Center in southern Israel; the hospital has denied that he died under their care.

Deputy commander of the Popular Forces, who was also the group's main military leader, Ghassan Duhine, was also wounded in action. Following Yasser Abu Shabab's death, Ghassan Duhine proclaimed himself the new leader of the Popular Forces. Duhine received medical treatment in Israel before returning to oversee a series of executions. Those killed reportedly included Abu Shabab’s bodyguards, who were accused of failing to intervene, as well as the gunman, his detained brother, and several others. Duhine also allegedly ordered attacks on homes belonging to the Abu Suneima family, during which several residents were wounded, mobile phones were confiscated, women were assaulted, and families were placed under lockdown.

On 7 December, Ghassan Duhine announced the execution of two of Hamas' members, claiming they had killed a Popular Forces member.

On 14 December, the Popular Forces claimed responsibility for the assassination of 49-year-old Lieutenant Colonel Ahmed Zamzam, who was a key member in Gaza's Internal Security Apparatus. Zamzam was gunned down by armed men in the Al-Maghazi refugee camp, with one of the men being arrested. The Gaza Interior Ministry-affiliated Rad'a force claimed the Zamzam had been killed by "Israeli-supported" mercenaries under direct guidance from Israel’s Shin Bet. An investigation by Asharq Al-Awsat had found that the assassination was carried out by members of Shawqi Abu Nasira's group.

The Counter-Terrorism Service (the Popular Forces' armed wing), on 20 December 2025 announced a military exercise called "Ensuring the Commander-1" (Ahd al-Qa’ed-1). The exercise lasted three days and aimed to test the CTS' readiness in emergency situations and review coordination among its ranks. The Chief of Staff of the Counter Terrorism Service, Khalid Abu Sneida, was also present during the exercise. During the operation, the Popular Forces' leader, Ghassan Duhine, revealed the existence of another militia operating in western Rafah, known as the Popular Defense Forces – Khalil al-Wazir Battalion.

On 22 December 2025, the special unit of the Gaza police known as the Sahm 103 unit or Arrow Unit, which specializes in targeting collaborators with Israel, said on its Telegram channel that it detained Abu Nasira’s wife, and also said that it detained Abu Nasira's son. Abu Nasira accused Hamas of having raided his house, abducted his wife and also stealing money, a gas canister and some solar panels. "I don’t know if this is a rule of law or of larceny" Abu Nasira said in an interview on 23 December 2025 with Jusoor News. The Arrow unit also stated that Abu Nasira’s family members had 700,000 Israeli shekels ($220,000 at the time) in their possession.

=== 2026 ===
==== January ====
On 4 January 2026, gunmen affiliated with the Shuja'iyya Popular Defense Forces (led by Rami Hilles) moved into the Sanafour Junction in Al-Tuffah. As the gunmen entered Al-Tuffah, they were met with gunfire from Hamas and allied gunmen. The shootout lasted around 20 minutes and left 2 Hamas militants, before the SPDF retreated into the Israeli-controlled side of the "Yellow Line".

On 7 January 2026, the Popular Forces reported that it killed two Hamas operatives during an operation in Rafah in southern Gaza. The group stated that the two men were killed after refusing to surrender, and that a third individual was detained during the same raid. The incident was reported amid broader coverage of armed activity involving Israel-aligned local groups in Gaza, separate from direct Israeli military operations.

In January 2026, the Counter-Terrorism Strike Force claimed responsibility for the assassination of 40-year-old Lieutenant Colonel Mahmoud Al-Astal, the head of investigations and the criminal police unit of the Gaza police in Khan Yunis. The killing was reported amid ongoing internal instability in Gaza despite a ceasefire and followed earlier operations attributed to Israel-aligned local groups operating independently of direct Israeli military involvement.

On 31 January 2026, the Popular Forces announced they had captured an Al-Qassam Brigade commander. The captive was identified as Adham Atallah al-Akar.

==== February ====
In February, the Popular Forces began destroying tunnels that are used by Hamas.

==== March ====
In March, the IDF launched a drone strike against Muhammad Abu Shaleh, a commander within Hamas’ Khan Younis Brigade. On March 15, the IDF launched a strike against a police vehicle in Salah al-Din, killing nine police officers, including Iyad Abu Yousif, an official in Hamas' Intervention Police. On the same day, Israel did an drone strike on a residential apartment in the Ayyash family home in the al-Sawarhah area, southwest of the Nuseirat Refugee Camp in the central Gaza Strip. The strike killed four people, including a couple in their thirties (including a women pregnant with twins), and their eight-year-old son while also displacing a child from a neighbouring family.

Since the start of the 2026 Iran War, the Counter-Terrorism Strike Force has launched incursions into Hamas' territory.

==== April ====
In April 2026, it was reported that the Free Homeland Forces, in the midst of the 2026 Iran War, had raided the Maghazi refugee camp near Deir al-Balah in Gaza searching for Hamas fighters while the Israeli military provided air support. The militia killed at least ten people and wounded many more.

==== August ====
In August, Israeli-backed militias expressed skepticism that Hamas would disarm under the proposed ceasefire arrangements. On August 6, Hamas announced that it had apprehended a Palestinian militant whom it alleged was linked to Israeli-backed armed groups, and called on Palestinians to target the groups' senior leaders while offering pardons to members who surrendered and renounced their affiliation.

== See also ==
- Popular Forces administration in the Gaza Strip
- Societal breakdown in the Gaza Strip during the Gaza war
- Palestinian internal political violence
- 2025 Hamas-Doghmush conflict
