= May 2025 Gaza offensive =

2025 Israeli military operation

- Part of the Israeli invasion of the Gaza Strip during the Gaza war
- IDF soldiers in Gaza, June 2025
Date	16 May – 4 August 2025 (2 months, 2 weeks and 5 days)
Location	Gaza Strip
Result	Inconclusive: Israeli failure to defeat Hamas, retrieve living hostages, and relocate Palestinian civilians to southern Gaza; 2025 Gaza City offensive
Territorial changes	Territorial objective of occupying 75% of Gaza achieved according to Israeli military estimates though disputed by journalist analysis

Belligerents
Israel	Hamas Palestinian allies: Palestinian Islamic Jihad Popular Front for the Liberation of Palestine Democratic Front for the Liberation of Palestine Palestinian Mujahideen Movement Al-Aqsa Martyrs' Brigades Popular Resistance Committees Abdul al-Qadir al-Husseini Brigades

Units involved
Israel Defense Forces; Israeli Ground Forces; 162nd Division; 252nd Division; 98th Division; 36th Division; Gaza Division; Israeli Air Force; Israeli Navy	(Palestine) Palestinian Joint Operations Room; (Hamas) Al-Qassam Brigades; (Hamas) Gaza Brigade; (Hamas) Central Brigade; (Hamas) Khan Yunis Brigade; (Hamas) Rafah Brigade; (Palestinian Islamic Jihad) Al-Quds Brigades; (Popular Front for the Liberation of Palestine) Abu Ali Mustafa Brigades; (Democratic Front for the Liberation of Palestine) National Resistance Brigades; Mujahideen Brigades; Al-Aqsa Martyrs' Brigades; (Popular Resistance Committees) Al-Nasser Salah al-Deen Brigades; Abdul al-Qadir al-Husseini Brigades

Casualties and losses
Per Israel: 48 Israeli soldiers killed	(Palestine) 400+ killed (Palestine) 1,000+ injured Per Israel: (Palestine) 2,100 militants killed (Palestine) 10,000 targets struck

On 4 May 2025, Israel's security cabinet approved a plan to expand its military offensive in the Gaza Strip. Codenamed Operation Gideon's Chariots (Hebrew: מבצע מרכבות גדעון), the offensive aimed to defeat Hamas, destroy its military and governing capabilities, and take control over three quarters of the Gaza Strip. The operation involved combined military force from land, air, and sea. On 16 May, Israel announced the launch of the operation. As of 4 July, the Israel Defense Forces (IDF) said it controlled approximately 65% of the Gaza Strip, most of which was captured during this offensive though this figure was disputed as being inaccurate and understating the control Hamas retains in Gaza. The United Nations Human Rights Office condemned the offensive as tantamount to ethnic cleansing.

Hamas responded with a counter-offensive that it calls Stones of David, consisting of a series of ambushes and small-scale military operations against the IDF.

On 4 August, Israeli sources reported the offensive had ended, without having achieved key Israeli aims, while the main territorial objective of capturing 75% of the Strip had been achieved. On 20 August, Israel launched "Operation Gideon's Chariots II", framed as a second part to the offensive, which aimed to take over Gaza City.

== Background ==
The operation was approved against the backdrop of ongoing confrontations with Hamas, the holding of Israeli hostages in Gaza, and the need to prevent the continued security threat to Israeli communities surrounding Gaza. The operation was developed by the IDF Chief of Staff and senior IDF command echelons, and approved by the Defense Minister and Prime Minister. It was unanimously approved by Israel’s Security Cabinet on 4 May 2025.

=== Operation names ===
The Palestinian and Israeli sides both choose religious names for the operation. The Israeli offensive was named after the biblical warrior Gideon, who led a successful battle against the Midianites. In May 2025 Operation Samson was suggested, and rejected, as a name for the operation before it was named Operation Gideon's Chariots. The reason for rejection was that the plan did not intend that the army would die with the enemy in the way that Samson died with the Philistines he killed.

Hamas's Qassam Brigades used similar symbolism. The name Stones of David (Arabic: حجارة داود, romanized: Hijarat Dawud, or Arabic: حجارة داوود) referenced the Prophet David's victory over the Philistine giant Goliath. This was a metaphor for their relatively small forces surviving against Israel, the most powerful military in the Middle East. The story of David and Goliath appears in the Old Testament and the Quran's Surah Al-Baqarah.

=== Plan ===
The main objectives of "Operation Gideon's Chariots" are twofold – to completely destroy Hamas's military and administrative infrastructure so that the organization can no longer exert any influence in Gaza, and to rescue the Israeli hostages held in Gaza since Hamas's attack on 7 October 2023. The operation includes a significant reinforcement of IDF forces, ground maneuvering deep into the Gaza Strip, and the use of heavy equipment to neutralize explosive devices and destroy buildings that the IDF says are used as terrorist infrastructure. On 19 May, Israeli Prime Minister Benjamin Netanyahu said that Israel plans to "take control of the entire Gaza Strip."

== Offensive ==
=== May ===
On the night of 16–17 May, the IDF began a ground advance towards Deir al-Balah for the first time during the war.

On 18 May, Israel said it have struck over 670 "Hamas targets" in a wave of preliminary airstrikes on the Gaza Strip, killing over 400 people and injuring another 1,000.

On 19 May, Israeli forces killed at least 136 people and shuttered the last functioning hospital in north Gaza. Israel also struck the medical supplies warehouse of Nasser Hospital in Khan Yunis, damaging the medical supplies provided by Medical Aid for Palestinians. Israel ordered all residents of Khan Yunis to leave to al-Mawasi, with IDF spokesperson Avichay Adraee declaring the entire area "a dangerous combat zone."

On 20 May, health officials in Gaza said that at least 49 people were killed in overnight strikes.

On 21 May, Israeli forces killed at least 82 people. Al-Awda Hospital was shelled by Israeli forces.

On 25 May, the Gaza Government Media Office reported that the IDF was in control of 77% of the Gaza Strip.

On 26 May, overnight Israeli strikes killed at least 54 Palestinians, including more than 35 killed in an airstrike on the Fahmi al-Jarjawi School in Gaza City. The IDF issued new evacuation orders displacing Palestinians in Khan Yunis, Bani Suheila, Abasan, and al-Qarara. The IDF initiated a renewed ground offensive into Khan Yunis.

On 27 May, the U.S.-backed Gaza Humanitarian Foundation began operations in Tel al-Sultan, Rafah, to deliver humanitarian aid. As thousands of starving Palestinians overwhelmed the distribution center, Israeli forces fired into the crowd, killing ten and injuring at least 62 people.

On 28 May, Hamas' Al-Qassam Brigades announced the beginning of its "Stones of David" counteroffensive with a first attack in Beit Lahia.

On 29 May, Israeli attacks killed at least 70 people across Gaza, including more than 23 in attacks on residential buildings in Bureij refugee camp. U.S. special envoy to the Middle East Steve Witkoff proposed a ceasefire agreement between Israel and Hamas that involved the release of 10 living hostages and 18 dead hostages, as well as a 60-day truce. Israel accepted the proposal while Hamas started reviewing it, asserting that it did not include provisions for a permanent ceasefire.

On 30 May, Israeli attacks killed more than 72 Palestinians and injured at least 278.

On 31 May, Israeli attacks killed 60 and injured 284 people. Hamas agreed to release 28 living and dead hostages but insisted that it requires a permanent ceasefire and a full Israeli withdrawal from the Gaza Strip.

=== June ===
On 1 June, 31 Palestinians were killed and at least 150 were injured by Israeli tanks and gunfire as they gathered for aid at Rafah.

On 3 June, at least 27 civilians were killed and 161 more were injured after the Israeli military said that its forces had opened fire on a group of individuals who had left designated access routes near the distribution centre in Rafah. The International Committee of the Red Cross meanwhile reported 184 injuries. Hamas meanwhile stated that so far at least 102 people had been killed and more than 490 wounded while seeking aid. On the next day, the IDF declared all roads leading to aid centers to be "combat zones," thereby closing the distribution centers for the day.

On 7 June, Palestinians reported "intense battles" near the European Hospital in Khan Yunis.

On 20 June the IDF said that it had killed Ibrahim Abu-Shamala, the financial chief of the Al-Qassam Brigades and a former aid to Marwan Issa.

=== July ===
On 3 July, Palestinian Islamic Jihad stated that it destroyed an Israeli military vehicle in al-Qarara.

The IDF began an offensive against Hamas in Beit Hanoun on 5 July. On 8 July, the IDF reported that five soldiers were killed and 14 were injured, after the Al-Qassam Brigades detonated explosives as troops entered a location in Beit Hanoun. In response to the attack, the IDF encircled Beit Hanoun on 9 July.

On 20 July, the IDF issued evacuation orders for the city of Deir al-Balah, where it had not launched a ground offensive since the start of the war.

On 31 July, a senior IDF official announced that the offensive would come to an end in the coming days.

=== August: end of offensive ===
On 2 August, Israel declared victory in Beit Hanoun after clearing remaining Hamas militants. Two days later, Israeli sources reported the offensive had ended. While the key territorial goal of taking control of over 75 percent of the Gaza Strip was achieved, other major objectives—defeating Hamas, retrieving live hostages, and relocating the Palestinian civilian population to the southern Gaza Strip—were not met, though several bodies of hostages were recovered. The IDF stated it did not plan to advance further in the Gaza Strip. Israel's leadership, however, remained in deliberation over whether to push on, with plans approved on 7 August by the security cabinet to take control of Gaza City, a move likely to be followed by further operations beyond it.

On 20 August, the IDF reported that during the Operation 10000 targets were struck, 2100 militants were killed, dozens of which infiltrated Israel during the October 7 attacks. The same day, Israeli defense minister Israel Katz approved a planned offensive to take over Gaza City and named it "Operation Gideon's Chariots II", framing it as a second part to the first offensive.

== Humanitarian city plan ==
On 4 February 2025, U.S. President Donald Trump declared at a joint press conference with Israeli Prime Minister Benjamin Netanyahu that the United States would "take over" and/or "own" the Gaza Strip, intending to demolish and redevelop the region. The plan involved relocating Palestinians to an unspecified "beautiful area", with no allowance for their return to Gaza. After Israel banned the delivery of food and medicine shipments to Gaza, the international community—including its allies—called for the blockade to be lifted. In early June, Israeli Defense Minister Israel Katz revealed a plan to relocate Palestinians from Gaza to a designated "humanitarian city" area within the ruins of the southern city of Rafah. The plan initially aims to house about 600,000 displaced Palestinians, with the capacity eventually increasing to accommodate the pre-war population of roughly 2.2 million. Before entering, Palestinians would undergo "security screening" and would not be allowed to leave Gaza for other regions; instead, they would be encouraged to emigrate to unspecified countries.

== Reactions ==
- Hamas: Hamas rejected Israel's "pressure and blackmail." Hamas official Basem Naim said there was "no point in any negotiations" while the Gaza blockade remained in place.
- United States: President Donald Trump pledged to help get food to Palestinians in Gaza, stating that "a lot of people were starving" in Gaza. He also expressed that he had been trying to get Israel to "stop that whole situation as quickly as possible." Secretary of State Marco Rubio said the U.S. was "troubled" by the situation.
- United Kingdom: The UK said that it "does not support an expansion of Israel's military operations in Gaza." Prime Minister Keir Starmer called the situation "intolerable." Foreign Secretary David Lammy suspended free trade talks with Israel and condemned Netanyahu's plans to "drive Gazans from their homes into a corner of the strip." Lammy also imposed sanctions on several Israeli settlers in the West Bank and condemned Bezalel Smotrich's calls to ethnically cleanse Gaza as "monstrous."
- France: Foreign Minister Jean-Noël Barrot said the European Union could suspend its agreement with Israel unless the Gaza offensive was halted. In a joint statement with the United Kingdom and Canada, France condemned the offensive, calling it "disproportionate" and "egregious" and threatening sanctions.
- Canada: Canada, along with France and the United Kingdom, condemned the offensive and threatened to take "concrete actions" including sanctions on Israel.
- Belgium: Foreign Minister Maxime Prévot called for sanctions against Israel and said that "only the word genocide" can describe what Israel was doing in Gaza.
- Germany: Chancellor Friedrich Merz said that the Israeli attacks "can no longer be justified as a fight against Hamas terrorism."
- Spain: Prime Minister Pedro Sánchez condemned the invasion and called for Israel to be excluded from the Eurovision Song Contest. He also said that Israel was conducting "war for war's sake."
- Sweden: Foreign Minister Maria Malmer Stenergard condemned the Israeli plans to take over Gaza, stating "If this means annexation, it is against international law. Sweden stands firm in its belief that Gaza’s territory must not be changed or reduced."
- Australia: Foreign Minister Penny Wong said Israel "cannot allow the suffering to continue" and condemned the "abhorrent and outrageous comments made by members of the Netanyahu Government about these people in crisis."
- Vatican City: Pope Leo XIV called for "an end to the hostilities whose heartbreaking price is being paid by children, the elderly and sick people" and demanded the "entrance of dignified humanitarian aid to Gaza."
- European Union: The EU expressed concern over "further casualties and suffering for the Palestinian population." It also condemned the expansion of the Israeli offensive as "abhorrent" and "disproportionate" and further stated that "Israeli strikes in Gaza go beyond what is necessary to fight Hamas." The EU began reviewing its trade ties with Israel following 19 months of war.
- United Nations: The UN called the situation "beyond description, beyond atrocious, and beyond inhumane" and stated that the proposal would constitute a breach of basic humanitarian principles. It also declared that it will not co-operate with Israeli forces.
  - UN Human Rights Office: UN human rights chief Volker Türk condemned the offensive, calling its bombing campaign intended to displace Palestinians "tantamount to ethnic cleansing."

== See also ==
- May 2025 Israeli attacks on Yemen
- 2025 Shuja'iyya offensive
- Battle of Khan Yunis (2025)
