= Saleh al-Jafarawi =

Palestinian journalist, media personality and content creator (1997–2025)

- صالح الجعفراوي
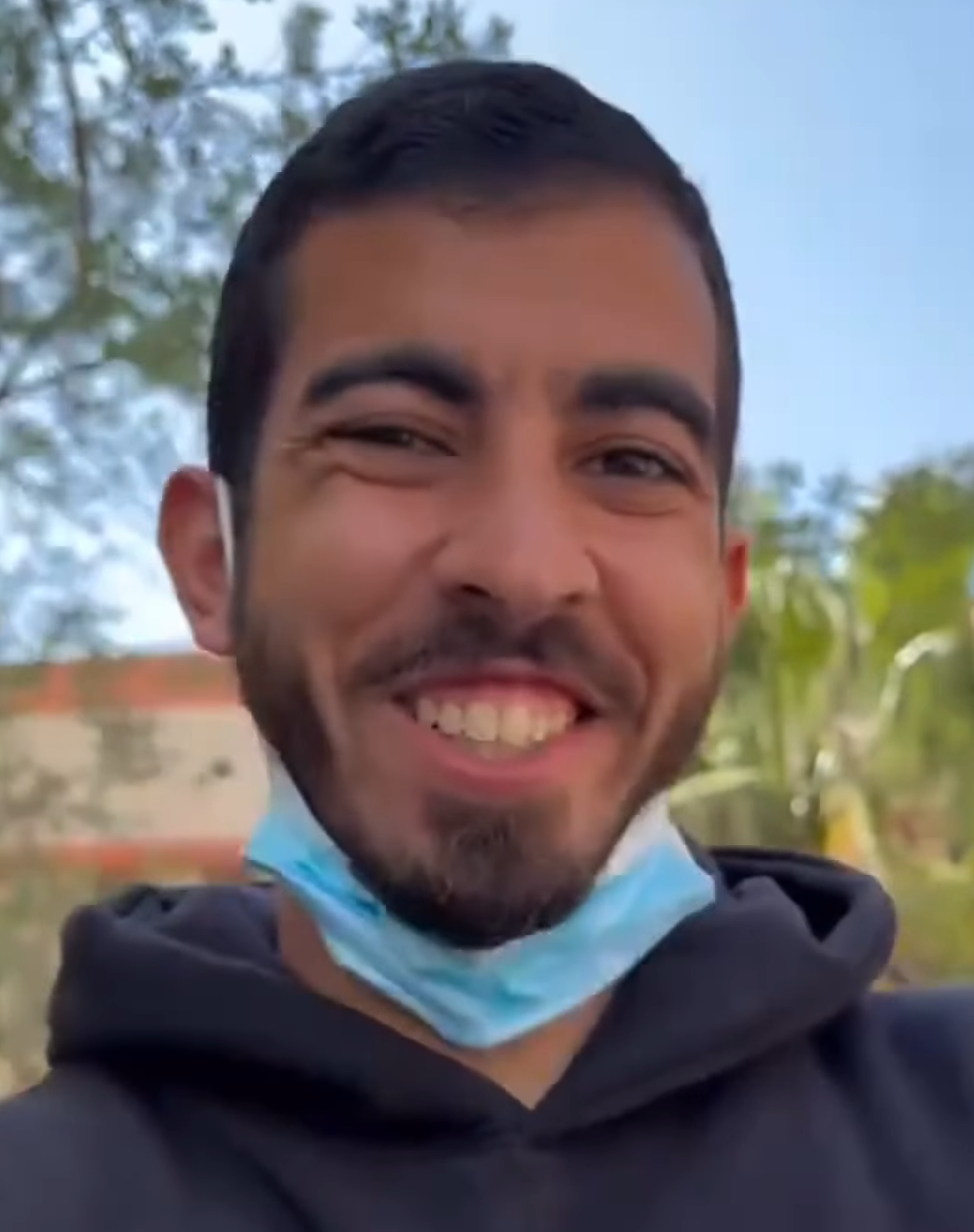
- Al-Jafarawi in 2025
- Born: 22 November 1997; Gaza City, Palestine
- Died: 12 October 2025 (aged 27); Sabra, Gaza, Palestine
- Cause of death: Gunshot wounds sustained during the 2025 Hamas-Doghmush conflict
- Education: Islamic University of Gaza
- Occupations: Journalist, content creator and table tennis player
- Years active: 2019–2025

Saleh al-Jafarawi (Arabic: صالح الجعفراوي, romanized: Ṣāliḥ al-Jaʻfarāwī; 22 November 1997 – 12 October 2025) was a Palestinian citizen journalist, social media influencer and table tennis player from Gaza. He was recognised during the Gaza war for his frontline video reporting and wide social media reach. During a period when a ceasefire was in place between Hamas and Israel, Saleh was shot and killed by members of an "armed militia" of Doghmush clan members amid clashes with Hamas in the Sabra neighborhood of Gaza City on 12 October 2025.

== Early life ==
Saleh al-Jafarawi was born in Gaza City in the Gaza Strip, on 22 November 1997. He attended the Islamic University of Gaza, where he received a bachelor's degree in media and journalism in 2019. He began producing content around 2018 on the Great March of Return, during which he covered the situation on the group as a freelance journalist for local media outlets. He also worked independently as a freelance photographer and journalist on social media platforms. His reporting style often involved documenting civilian suffering and destruction during Israeli military operations in Gaza.

Prior to his journalism role, Al-Jafarawi was a table tennis player and represented Palestine in international table competitions, including the WTT Feeder in Doha, Qatar in 2023.

== Career ==
Al-Jafarawi became well known during the Gaza war, when his videos from the conflict zones went viral on platforms such as Instagram, YouTube, and TikTok. He amassed a large following, and his content was widely shared.

In November 2023, pro-Israel influencers falsely claimed that al-Jafarawi had faked a scene of being hospitalized and labelled the video as "Pallywood." Voice of America reported that a video alleging to show Jafarawi faking hospitalization was in fact a misidentification.

In March 2025, al-Jafarawi's Instagram account was suspended "indefinitely", forcing him to use a backup account.

In late September 2025, al-Jafarawi's followers raised alarm after the Israel Defense Forces Arabic-language spokesperson Avichay Adraee alleged that al-Jafarawi was affiliated with Hamas. His followers feared that, like other Palestinian journalists in Gaza accused of associations with Hamas, al-Jafarawi could be targeted in the near future. They drew comparison to the journalist Anas al-Sharif, who was targeted and killed in Gaza by Israel with similar allegations.

== Death ==
On 12 October 2025, al-Jafarawi was shot and killed by Doghmush clan members amid clashes with Hamas in Sabra, Gaza City. (Note: Sources mislabel his age as "28".) Palestinian sources have indicated that there were confrontations in Hasher Sabra involving Hamas security personnel and members of the Daghmush tribe; however, local authorities have yet to verify this information.

After his death, Instagram removed al-Jafarawi's account which had 4.5 million followers at the time of his death as well as its digital archives from the Wayback Machine. According to Meta, they justified the erasure of al-Jafarawi's account under its policy on "dangerous organizations and individuals." TRT World wrote that this justification has repeatedly been used to purge pro-Palestinian journalists and activists from its platforms.

== See also ==
- List of journalists killed in the Gaza war
