= Israeli attacks on Al-Maghazi refugee camp =

Attacks on a refugee camp in the Gaza Strip

- Part of the Gaza war, genocide and anti-Hamas insurgency in Gaza
- Location within the Gaza Strip
- Location: 31°25′16.89″N 34°23′7.35″E; Maghazi camp, central Gaza Strip
- Date: 5 November 2023–present
- Target: Maghazi refugee camp
- Attack type: Airstrike
- Deaths: 190+ civilians
- Perpetrators: Israel Defense Forces; Israeli Air Force; Popular Forces; (Palestine) Free Homeland Forces

Since the outbreak of the Gaza war on 7 October 2023, the Israel Defense Forces (IDF) has conducted numerous airstrikes in densely populated Palestinian refugee camps in both the Gaza Strip and West Bank. Al-Maghazi refugee camp was struck several times.

== 17 October 2023 attack ==
Israeli forces conducted an airstrike on a school run by the United Nations Relief and Works Agency for Palestine Refugees in the Near East (UNRWA) in the Al-Maghazi refugee camp, killing six people and injuring dozens, including UNRWA staff. The school building sustained a severe structural damage.

== 5 November 2023 attack ==
The Israel Defense Forces conducted an airstrike in the al-Maghazi refugee camp in the central Gaza Strip. According to the Gaza Health Ministry, at least 45 people were killed, mostly women and children. The IDF did not confirm that the camp had been hit with an Israeli airstrike and said its airstrikes were "specific intelligence-based strikes, specifically against terrorist elements." The airstrike caused severe damage to neighboring homes and infrastructure. The Gaza Health Ministry stated that more than 30 bodies were brought to Al-Aqsa Martyrs Hospital in Deir Al-Balah following the airstrike.

== 6 December 2023 attack ==
On 6 December 2023 at about 21:00, Israeli forces bombed a residential building in Barkat Al-Waz area, killing 18 Palestinians, mostly children, and injuring 20 others.

== 24 and 25 December 2023 strike ==
On 24 and 25 December 2023, Israeli forces bombed the camp, killing more than 100 people. Gaza Health Ministry spokesperson Ashraf al-Qudra described the attack as a "massacre being committed on crowded residential square". The Associated Press reported on 25 December they had seen records from the nearby Al-Aqsa Hospital which indicated that at least 106 people had been killed in the attack.

An IDF spokesperson stated that the strike "apparently resulted in harm to those not involved" and that "the IDF regrets the harm to those not involved." An IDF official said that the extensive death toll was due to incorrect munitions being used in the attack.

== 2024 attacks ==
Fifteen people were killed in an airstrike on a home in Al-Maghazi on 1 January. On 5 January 2024, it was reported that Israel has increased violence towards camp residents. People were being shot at and crushed by tanks. Al Jazeera reported that an Israeli sniper shot dead a mother and her infant, "piercing the baby’s skull with a bullet". On 16 January, sixteen bodies were recovered from under rubble following multiple days of airstrikes. Multiple people were reportedly killed and injured on 29 March. At least three people were reportedly killed by an Israeli bombing on 31 March.

On 3 April, two Palestinians were killed and 15 others were injured when Israeli forces targeted a home in the camp. On 16 April, health officials reported that an Israeli airstrike killed 13 people, including seven children; one witness stated that, "You are killing children. You are not killing an army or fighters; you are killing children who were peacefully playing in the street.", and another, speaking of "kids dead on the ground", said "They were just playing foosball, and they were martyred." Several other people were wounded in the airstrike, with dozens of injured people being sent to the Shuhada al-Aqsa Hospital.

On 25 June, Israeli forces bombed a house in the Maghazi refugee camp, killing five people, three of which were children. On 4 July 2024, three people in a car were reportedly killed by an Israeli airstrike — one of the dead had on their UN vest. On 2 August, two Palestinians were killed after Israeli forces targeted a group of civilians in the camp. On 17 October, nine people, including children, were killed after Israeli forces shelled a house in the camp. On 19 October, at least eleven people were killed by an Israeli airstrike. On 24 October, four people were killed and several others were injured when Israeli forces targeted the al-Maghazi Service club, a facility housing displaced families. On 6 December, an Israeli airstrike resulted the deaths of two people and three others were injured.

== 2025–2026 attacks ==
On 3 January 2025, nine people were killed and ten others were injured when Israeli forces bombed a house in the refugee camp, according to the Palestinian Civil Defence spokesperson, Mahmoud Basal. On 18 June, Wafa, a Palestinian news agency, reported that at least ten Palestinians were killed by an Israeli bombing when Israeli forces targeted a home of the al-Ghamri family in the camp.

On 14 December 2025, the Popular Forces claimed responsibility for the assassination of 49-year-old Lieutenant Colonel Ahmed Zamzam, who was a key member in Gaza's Internal Security Apparatus. Zamzam was gunned down by armed men in the Maghazi refugee camp, with one of the men being arrested. The Gaza Interior Ministry-affiliated Rad'a force claimed the Zamzam had been killed by "Israeli-supported" mercenaries under direct guidance from Israel’s Shin Bet. An investigation by Asharq Al-Awsat had found that the assassination was carried out by members of Shawqi Abu Nasira's group.

On 30 January 2026, Wafa reported that two people were killed by an Israeli drone despite the ceasefire.

In April 2026, the Free Homeland Forces raided the Al-Maghazi refugee camp near Deir al-Balah in Gaza searching for Hamas fighter while the Israel Defense Forces provided air support. The militia killed at least ten people and wounded many more.

== See also ==
- Attacks on refugee camps in the Gaza war
- Attacks on schools during the Israeli invasion of Gaza
- Airstrikes on Jabalia Refugee Camp (2023-2024)
- August 2024 Deir el-Balah attacks
