= Qizan an-Najjar =

Palestinian settlement in Gaza Strip

Coordinates: 31°19′26″N 34°17′12″E

- Municipality type D (Village council)

Arabic transcription(s)
  - Arabic: قيزان النَجّار
- Interactive map of Qizan an-Najjar
- Location of Qizan an-Najjar within Palestine
- State: State of Palestine
- Governorate: Khan Yunis
- Controlled by: (Palestine) Counter-Terrorism Strike Force administration in the Gaza Strip

Government
  - Type: Village council

Population (2006)
  - Total: 3,889

Qizan an-Najjar (Arabic: قيزان النَجّار, also spelled Qizan al-Najar or Kizan al-Najjar) is a Palestinian village in the southern Gaza Strip, part of the Khan Yunis Governorate. It is located along the Salah al-Din Road between Khan Yunis and Rafah. In the 1997 census by the Palestinian Central Bureau of Statistics (PCBS) Qizan an-Najjar had a population of 2,733. Its population rose to 3,889 in the 2006 estimate by the PCBS.

During the Gaza war, it came under the control of the Counter-Terrorism Strike Force (CSF), an anti-Hamas armed group.
