= Fața =

Fața may refer to several places in Romania:

- Fața, a village in Albac Commune, Alba County
- Fața-Lăzești, a village in Scărișoara Commune, Alba County
- Fața Abrudului, a village in Câmpeni town, Alba County
- Fața Cristesei and Fața Lăpușului, villages in Arieșeni Commune, Alba County
- Fața Pietrii, a village in Stremț Commune, Alba County
- Fața lui Nan, a village in Cozieni Commune, Buzău County
- Fața Roșie, a village in Bătrâna Commune, Hunedoara County
- Fața Motrului, a village in Stângăceaua Commune, Mehedinți County
- Fața Cremenii, a village in Tâmna Commune, Mehedinți County
- Fața (river), a tributary of the Timișana in Timiș County

== See also ==
- Fețeni (disambiguation)
