= Counter-Terrorism Strike Force =

Palestinian militant organization

- قوة مكافحة الإرهاب (Arabic); Quwwat Mukafahat al-Irhab
- Leader: Hosam al-Astal
- Dates active: 21 August 2025 – present
- Split from: Popular Forces
- Headquarters: Qizan an-Najjar, Khan Yunis
- Active regions: Qizan an-Najjar, Khan Yunis,
- Ideology: Anti-Hamas
- Size: 40 – 100 fighters
- Wars: Gaza war; 2025 Khan Yunis offensive; October 2025 Hamas raid in Khan Yunis; Anti-Hamas insurgency in Gaza; 2026 Iran war
- Website: Official Facebook page

The Counter-Terrorism Strike Force (CTSF) or the Anti-Terror Strike Force (ATSF) also known as the Strike Force Against Terror (SFAT; Arabic: قوة الضربة لمكافحة الإرهاب, romanized: Quwwat al-Darbat li'Mukafahat al-Irhab) is an anti-Hamas Palestinian militant organization that emerged during the Gaza war. It is based in Qizan an-Najjar in Khan Yunis, and is reportedly supported by Israel.

== Background ==
The CTSF was founded on 21 August 2025 during the societal breakdown within Gaza, stating to combat the "repression and terrorism practiced by Hamas". It was founded in the village of Qizan an-Najjar, south of Khan Yunis.

== History ==
The group was founded by Hosam al-Astal, a Palestinian Bedouin who worked in Israel and then worked for the Palestinian Authority's National Security Forces (NSF) when they still controlled the Gaza Strip. He has spoken favourably about the era of direct Israeli military rule in Gaza prior to the 2005 disengagement. Al-Astal was previously imprisoned and given a death sentence by Hamas for his involvement with Israel, and was accused of involvement in the 2018 assassination of Fadi Mohammad al-Batsh, an engineer associated with Hamas' al-Qassam Brigades in Malaysia, who had allegedly went there in order to improve the design of the Hamas Qassam rocket.

CTSF control over Kizan al-Najjar was first announced in September 2025, with al-Astal referring to the area as a "humanitarian zone" for which he was responsible. The Israel Defense Forces (IDF) reportedly evacuated the village and transferred it to al-Astal's control. Kizan al-Najjar had been depopulated due to the war, but displaced Gazans invited by al-Astal began resettling the village.

The CTSF has been able to deploy its fighters outside of its territory, as shown by its intervention during the Hamas raid in Khan Yunis on 3 October.

With the implementation of the 10 October ceasefire in Gaza, al-Astal says the CTSF territory lies along the new frontline that the IDF pulled back to, though its troops remain nearby.

In November 2025, the Counter-Terrorism Strike Force voiced their support for the Gaza peace plan and their willingness to cooperate with the United Nations mandated Board of Peace established to oversee the administration and reconstruction of the Gaza Strip.

== Organization and structure ==
The CTSF's leadership consists largely of figures affiliated with the Palestinian National Liberation Movement—better known as Fatah—mainly from Hosam al-Astal's extended family.

The CTSF controls the village of Qizan an-Najjar, where it is also headquartered.

Compared to the Popular Forces, despite being smaller in relative size, the CTSF is more aligned with Israel, with members of the group being able to speak fluent Hebrew when talking to Israeli media. The group also operated more boldly than most of its other counterparts in Gaza. The CTSF also presents itself as potential alternative to Hamas' rule in Gaza more often than other anti-Hamas groups.

== Relations ==
The neoconservative Foundation for Defense of Democracies (FDD) said that the CTSF is supported by Israel's Shin Bet and the Israeli Defense Forces (IDF). Its leader, Hosam al-Astal, also has links to the Mossad. Al-Astal has justified his group's relationship with Israel as "the only way to survive" for his group.

According to The Jerusalem Post the CTSF and the Popular Forces are reportedly in contact with one another but work independently. Before founding the Counter-Terrorism Strike Force, Ynet reported that al-Astal was a member of the Popular Forces.

== Operations ==
Al-Astal has said that the CTSF helped defend the al-Mujaida clan of Khan Yunis after Hamas forces launched a raid on the clan on 3 October 2025. It marked the first time the group battled Hamas.

In October 2025, the CTSF reached an agreement with the Israeli Defense Forces (IDF) to establish a "Green Line" where no fighting would take place.

In November 2025, al-Astal told Israeli media that "U.S. representatives" had stated that his group would play a part in the future police force in Gaza. Al-Astal, who once worked with the Palestinian Authority (PA), said that he and his group coordinated with Israel to bring supplies to the CTSF and expressed interest to collaborate with PA and the United States.

In January 2026, the CTSF claimed responsibility for the assassination of 40-year-old Lieutenant Colonel Mahmoud al-Astal, the head of investigations and the criminal police unit of the Gazan police in Khan Yunis and also a relative of Hosam al-Astal. The killing was reported amid ongoing internal instability in Gaza despite a ceasefire and followed earlier operations attributed to Israel-aligned local groups operating independently of direct Israeli military involvement.

During the 2026 Iran war, the CTSF operated in Hamas-controlled territories.

== Administration ==
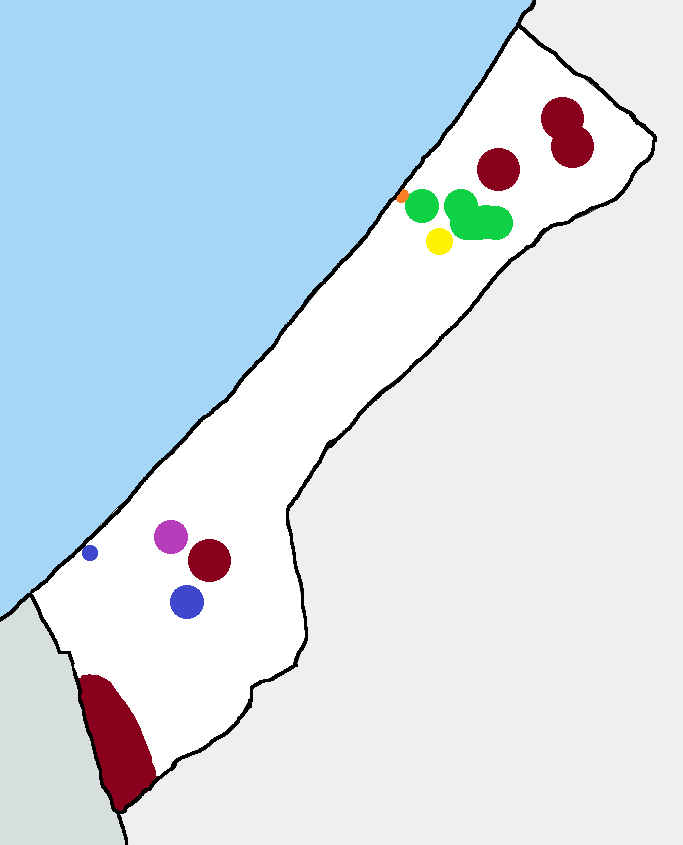
Areas controlled by CTSF

The CTSF primarily operated its administration in southeastern Khan Younis, with a presence in Qizan al-Najjar, Jorat al-Lout, and al-Manara.

In September 2025, Hosam Al-Astal said that the civilian population in the village of Kizan al-Najjar consisted of around 30 families fleeing from Hamas, and was growing.

According to a CTSF video published online, Kizan al-Najjar boasts brightly lit buildings, a rarity in the Gaza Strip due to Israel cutting power to the territory during the war. Al-Astal claimed in 2025 that solar panels are used in the village and that he expects Israel to provide direct electricity and water.

The CTSF operates an all-female police unit, meant to serve as the internal security of Kizan al-Najjar.

== See also ==
- Counter-Terrorism Strike Force administration in the Gaza Strip
- Outline of the Gaza war
- Politics of the Gaza Strip
- Timeline of the Gaza war (20 August 2025 – 2 October 2025)
- Timeline of the Israeli–Palestinian conflict in 2025
- Project New Gaza
- Popular Forces
  - Popular Forces administration in the Gaza Strip
- Shuja'iyya Popular Defense Forces
  - Shuja'iyya Popular Defense Forces administration in the Gaza Strip
