= 2025 Gaza Strip aid distribution killings =

Killings of Palestinians seeking aid

- Part of the Gaza war, Gaza Strip famine, Gaza genocide, and the Hamas–Popular Forces conflict
- Palestinians killed near the Zikim crossing

- Locations within the Gaza Strip
- Location: Tel al-Sultan, Rafah, Khan Yunis, and Netzarim, Gaza Strip
- Date: 27 May – 9 October 2025 (4 months, 1 week and 5 days)
- Target: (Palestine) Palestinian civilians seeking aid
- Attack type: Mass shootings, genocidal massacres
- Deaths: 2,615+
- Injuries: 19,177+
- Victims: 9 missing
- Perpetrators: Israel Defense Forces; (Palestine) Popular Forces (alleged); (United States) Gaza Humanitarian Foundation (potential complicity); Safe Reach Solutions; UG Solutions (potential complicity); Infidels Motorcycle Club

From 27 May to 9 October 2025, amid a famine in the Gaza Strip, more than 2,600 Palestinian civilians seeking aid were killed and thousands more were wounded when being fired upon by the Israel Defense Forces (IDF), armed gangs, and contractors hired by the Gaza Humanitarian Foundation (GHF). Most of the deadly incidents occurred in the vicinity of short-lived aid distribution sites operated by the US- and Israeli-backed GHF.

The killings began taking place on the first day of the GHF's operations, following an 11-week Israeli blockade since early March 2025 that had severely restricted humanitarian aid to Gaza, exacerbating the Gaza humanitarian crisis. On 31 July 2025, the Office of the United Nations High Commissioner for Human Rights (OHCHR) reported that, as of 31 July, at least 1,373 Palestinian aid seekers were killed: 859 near GHF's sites and 514 near UN and other organizations' aid convoys. On 5 July, the Gaza Health Ministry reported that at least 743 Palestinians were killed and over 4,891 injured; and earlier, on 1 July, the Ministry noted that around 70% of dead victims were killed at GHF sites. Critics have referred to the regular mass killings at GHF distribution sites as the "hunger games" in reference to the American media franchise.

The American non-profit the Center for Constitutional Rights believes the GHF could potentially be legally liable for complicity in war crimes, crimes against humanity, and genocide against Palestinians. Amnesty International says that evidence it has gathered suggests that the GHF's purpose is "to placate international concerns while constituting another tool of Israel’s genocide". The United Nations and over 170 charities and NGOs, including Save the Children and Oxfam, accuse the GHF of failure to uphold and even violating humanitarian norms by forcing two million Palestinians into overcrowded and militarised zones and subjecting aid-seekers to almost daily attacks. Additionally, those organisations, later joined by Human Rights Watch, demanded that the GHF and its aid distribution system be closed immediately.

In late June 2025, Haaretz reported that IDF troops had received orders to fire on the unarmed crowds to "keep them away from food distribution centers". Israeli Prime Minister Benjamin Netanyahu and Defense Minister Israel Katz denied these claims, calling the Haaretz report a "blood libel." American security contractors such as Safe Reach Solutions (SRS) had reportedly also been firing live ammunition and lobbing stun grenades at Palestinians seeking aid. A former GHF worker said that he witnessed the IDF shooting indiscriminately at Palestinian civilians. Amidst a ceasefire implemented on 10 October, officials announced that GHF sites in the Strip would be temporarily shut down.

== Background ==
The Gaza Humanitarian Foundation (GHF) was registered in both Delaware, United States, and Geneva, Switzerland, in February 2025, and is described by the BBC as aiming to provide an "alternative to the UN as the main supplier of aid" to Gaza. The foundation is backed by both the Trump administration and the Israeli government.

Due to Israeli checkpoints into Gaza which predate the October 7 attacks, the Israeli government and the IDF have controlled the entrance of humanitarian aid into Gaza, with aid delivery disrupted multiple times over the years, either via Israeli government blockades or Israeli civilian protests. On 2 March 2025, Israel blocked almost all humanitarian aid from entering Gaza. In May, Israel increased the amount of aid entering Gaza, but humanitarian organizations have stated that it is insufficient, and the Integrated Food Security Phase Classification (IPC) has warned that Gaza is at high risk of famine. Israel has accused Hamas of routinely diverting aid. Aid organizations, including USAID and the UN, have denied these claims. The UN has attributed the aid theft to Palestinian groups supported by the Israeli military, such as the Popular Forces.

The GHF began operations on 26 May 2025 at a new distribution center in Rafah. The GHF sites are secured by American contractors, particularly Safe Reach Solutions (SRS), with Israeli troops patrolling the perimeter. The sites have chain-link fences directing Palestinians into military base-resembling structures surrounded by large sand berms. Palestinians are expected to go through identity checks and screening for involvement with Hamas prior to accessing food. The UN condemned the GHF plan and insisted that it would not operate with any scheme that fails to uphold humanitarian principles, with a spokesperson imploring Israel to open all entrances into the Gaza Strip and saying that the GHF's operations were a "distraction from what is actually needed".

== Incidents ==
=== 27–28 May ===
On 27 May 2025, the GHF began distributing aid at a distribution center in Tel al-Sultan in Rafah under Israel Defense Forces (IDF) oversight. Thousands of Palestinians gathered to access food packages. The size of the crowd, which included women and children, led to chaos as people clambered over fences and pushed through packed corridors to reach the supplies. According to the GHF, the chaos resulted in the temporary withdrawal of American forces from the compound, allowing some Gazans to "take aid safely and dissipate."

The Gaza Government Media Office reported that Israeli tanks opened fire on the crowd, calling it a "deliberate massacre" and a "full-fledged war crime." The death count was later updated to 10 killed and 62 wounded. The IDF denied firing at Palestinians, saying that it had fired "warning shots" in an outside area to establish control over the situation. A UN spokesperson disputed the Israeli narrative, stating that "most of those injured are due to gunshots" from the IDF.

Videos circulating show people running away from the distribution center in panic as gunfire is heard in the distance. They also show a military helicopter firing flares from the sky.

On 28 May, the Gaza Government Media Office stated that the IDF had killed ten civilians and wounded 62 others over the past 48 hours at the aid distribution site. On 31 May, three Palestinians were killed in Rafah while trying to reach the aid distribution centre, according to Palestinian medical sources. The Gaza Health Ministry, meanwhile, stated that the death toll at the Rafah aid distribution centre had risen to 17 killed, 86 wounded, and five missing.

=== 1–15 June ===
On 1 June 2025, the IDF reportedly killed 32 civilians and wounded over 250 at the aid centre in Rafah. The Palestine Red Crescent Society stated that its paramedics had rescued at least 23 dead Palestinians and another 23 wounded from the area. According to Nasser Hospital's emergency department, 150 injured people and 28 bodies were brought to the hospital. The GHF responded saying that the reports were "untrue" and "fabricated" by Hamas, publishing undated security camera footage showing a calm atmosphere to support its claims. The IDF also called the reports "false," denying that it had fired "within or near" the aid distribution center, and released a drone video which it claimed showed unrelated looting at Khan Yunis where Palestinian militants threw rocks and fired at civilians heading to collect aid. Meanwhile, the Gaza Health Ministry, hospital officials, and several witnesses testified that Israel was responsible for the gunfire at Rafah. Médecins Sans Frontières said that its patients at Nasser Hospital "reported being shot at from all sides by Israeli drones, helicopters, boats, tanks and soldiers." A CNN review based on witness testimonies, video evidence, and expert analysis found that the shots were likely fired by the Israeli army at a location where the GHF operated. Pro-Palestinian social media accounts referred to the 1 June incident as the "Witkoff massacre", referring to US Middle East envoy Steve Witkoff, who had endorsed Israel's plan to take over aid delivery in Gaza.

Footage of the aftermath of a strike was initially claimed to have occurred near the aid centre, but was later determined by BBC Verify to be a previously unreported Israel Defense Forces strike 4.5 km (2.8 miles) from the aid centre at al-Mawasi on 1 June 2025; the Israel Defense Forces told the BBC that they had "wrongfully hit the Mawasi area" with artillery that "deviated" after "technical and operational errors".

On 2 June, the Gaza Government Media Office stated that three people were killed and 35 others wounded by the IDF near the aid center, with the IDF claiming that its troops had shot at suspects who were approaching towards them. It also stated that 75 people had been killed and more than 400 others had been wounded since 27 May by the IDF.

On 3 June, at least 27 civilians were killed and 161 more were injured after the Israeli military said that its forces had opened fire on a group of individuals who had left designated access routes near the distribution centre in Rafah. The International Committee of the Red Cross meanwhile reported 184 injuries. Hamas meanwhile stated that so far at least 102 people had been killed and more than 490 wounded while seeking aid. On the next day, the IDF declared all roads leading to aid centers to be "combat zones," thereby closing the distribution centers for the day.

The Gaza Humanitarian Foundation stated that it would close its aid distribution sites on 4 June, with the IDF declaring routes leading to them as combat zones. The sites reopened on 5 June.

On 6 June, eight Palestinians were killed and 61 others wounded near the aid distribution centre in Rafah. The death toll near the aid distribution sites meanwhile rose to 110 killed and 583 wounded.

The Gaza Humanitarian Foundation again shut the aid centres on 7 June, accusing Hamas of threatening it, and stated that it would open on the following day. Hamas denied the allegation. That same day, six more Palestinians were killed and several others were injured by Israeli forces near the aid distribution centre.

On 8 June, Palestinian health officials said at least 13 people were killed and 173 others were injured by Israeli forces near the aid distribution centre in Rafah. The Israeli military said they fired warning shots at people it said were suspects who had advanced toward its forces and ignored warnings to turn away but did not see any casualties. Eleven bodies were brought to Nasser Hospital in Khan Yunis, while another body and 29 injured people were brought to Al-Awda Hospital in Jabalia. Palestinian witnesses there said Israeli forces had fired on them at a roundabout that is around a kilometre (half-mile) from a site run in the nearby city of Rafah. The total civilian toll at the aid centers rose to 125 killed, 736 wounded and nine missing per Hamas.

Survivors of the repeated mass killings perpetrated at the distribution sites have begun to refer to the Israeli-backed operation as traps or death traps rather than aid.

On 9 June, 14 civilians were killed and more than 99 wounded near the aid distribution site, with Palestinians accusing the IDF and allied local gunmen from the Popular Forces of firing at them. The Gaza Humanitarian Foundation, meanwhile, stated that it had closed one of its centres in Tel al-Sultan due to chaotic conditions caused by the crowds.

On 10 June, another 36 civilians were killed, and 207 were wounded near an aid distribution site, according to the Gaza Ministry of Health. The victims were seeking aid before "warning shots to distance suspects" were fired by the IDF towards individuals that they claim "posed a threat to troops." By this time, at least 163 people were killed and 1,495 were wounded while trying to receive aid from the GHF.

On 11 June, an additional 25 people were killed at night near a GHF food distribution center. Once again, the Israeli government claims to have been firing warning shots at "suspects", while the Palestinian Civil Defence claims that the IDF opened fire. Another 14 were killed by the IDF near a GHF center, according to the Nasser Hospital. At this point, the total deaths near GHF centers have increased to 223, with the total injuries rising to 1,858. There were a total of 60 killed by the IDF on 11 June.

On 12 June, 26 more people were killed by Israeli drone attacks while waiting near the aid distribution centres. The total dead near GHF aid centers has risen to 245 and the wounded to 2,152 by this time. The Gaza Humanitarian Foundation meanwhile accused Hamas of killing eight of its aid workers, injuring 21 others, and possibly taking some hostage in an attack on a bus carrying over two dozen of its Palestinian staff west of Khan Yunis. The organization also said that members of Hamas had intimidated hospital staff from treating the aid workers. Social media within Gaza said that Hamas targeted the bus because it was transporting GHF employees linked to Yasser Abu Shabab. Referring to the same event, Al-Khazindar Company, a Palestinian group that works with GHF, said that Hamas militants had targeted its workers and killed eight people in its attack. The company director said that Hamas had threatened the killed workers and that his other workers had been beaten and shot. The police force of the Gaza Strip said that on 12 June its Sahm unit killed 12 Popular Forces militants backed by Israel, publishing a video purportedly showing their bodies. The Popular Forces meanwhile said to have killed five Hamas militants. The Abu Shabab group said on Facebook that its members were not targeted by Hamas in the bus attack. GHF said that they do not work with the Abu Shabab group and that its staff includes unarmed Palestinian workers as well as armed international contractors, who are mostly American, and guard the centers. The bus attack occurred after Hamas issued a warning in the prior week that any individual or company in cooperation with GHF would receive "decisive and uncompromising action." Hamas reiterated the warning on 8 June, saying it had commanded its forces to strike those in cooperation with the GHF. The Abu Shabab militia also accused Hamas of detaining and killing aid staff.

From 13 to 14 June, an additional 29 aid seekers were killed and over 380 were wounded by the IDF near aid distribution centers. The total number of aid seekers killed and wounded by the IDF has risen to 274 and 2,532, respectively.

At least 17 Palestinians were killed near GHF aid centers on 15 June. The Gaza Health Ministry likens the aid sites to "human slaughterhouses."

=== 16–30 June ===
On the morning of 16 June, 23 aid seekers were killed and 200 others were wounded near aid sites in Rafah, according to medics. By this time, at least 338 people have been killed, at least 2,831 injured and nine missing at sites since 27 May.

On 17 June, according to the Palestinian Ministry of Health, Israeli troops killed 59 and injured 221 others, with witnesses reporting that Israeli soldiers, tanks, and drones fired onto civilians and at least two Israeli shells landed in the middle of the crowd, describing the attacks as a "massacre". This was the deadliest of the killings that have occurred near aid distribution centers in Khan Yunis, Gaza. According to the Gaza Humanitarian Foundation, the incident occurred near the United Nations World Food Programme distribution centre. The IDF admitted firing in the area and issued a statement saying that, "The details of the incident are under review." The total deaths at aid sites has subsequently increased to 397 with over 3,000 wounded. Haaretz reported that this was due to Israeli troops deliberately using artillery fire on civilian crowds.

On 18 June, at least 12 more Palestinians were killed and 72 wounded by Israeli fire while waiting for aid trucks according to a spokesperson for Al-Aqsa Hospital. The total number of Palestinian aid seekers killed increased to over 400.

On 19 June, rescuers and medics reported that Israeli forces wounded 60 and killed 12 Palestinians waiting for aid near a GHF's site in central Gaza, despite GHF's denial and IDF's claim that it fired "warning shots" at approaching "suspects" in Netzarim.

On 20 June, witnesses and medics reported that Israeli tanks and drones fired at thousands of Palestinian aid seekers, of whom 23 were killed and over 100 wounded, near a GHF site in central Gaza, despite GHF's denial and IDF's claim it fired "warning shots" at gathering Palestinians and its admission that one IDF aircraft struck some approaching "suspects".

According to the Palestinian Civil Defence, eight people were killed by IDF gunfire on 21 June. By this time, the total number of people killed at aid sites has risen to 450 and the number wounded to 3,466.

On 22 June, media outlets in Gaza reported that six people were killed and dozens of others were injured by IDF gunfire while waiting for aid.

On 24 June, Palestinian hospitals and witnesses stated that IDF forces and drones opened fire on a crowd of hundreds of people waiting for aid, killing at least 40 people. The total number of aid seekers killed during this period has risen to 516 with over 3,799 having been wounded.

On 26 June, three people were killed and several others injured by the Israeli army while waiting for aid at the Netzarim Corridor. By this time, the death toll has risen to 549, at least 4,066 have been injured, and 39 remained missing.

On 27 June, Israeli gunfire killed 10 people as they were waiting for aid at separate sites. As of 27 June, at least 613 Palestinians aid seekers were killed, 509 near GHF distribution points, as stated on 4 July by spokesperson Ravina Shamdasani for the UN's Office of the High Commissioner for Human Rights.

By 29 June, the Gaza Health Ministry updated Palestinian casualties it could document, namely, the number of deaths to 583 and the number of injuries to 4,186.

On 30 June 23 people in Khan Yunis were killed by Israeli troops and drones firing "indiscriminately" at crowds awaiting aid.

=== 1–15 July ===
On 3 July, at least 15 people were killed while waiting for aid in the Al-Tahliya area of southwestern Khan Yunis. Another 25 were killed near the Netzarim corridor.

On 5 July, Gaza authorities reported that, within the last 24 hours, Israeli military killed 23 people near aid distribution sites, though not exactly where and how. The Israeli military had no immediate comment. On that same day, two American aid workers from the Gaza Humanitarian Foundation were injured by Hamas operatives in a food distribution site. The operatives threw two grenades at the workers, lightly injuring them. The IDF reported the Americans received needed medical treatment. By this time, at least 743 Palestinians had been killed and over 4,831 had been injured while seeking aid from GHF facilities, according to health officials.

By 7 July, the Office of the United Nations High Commissioner for Human Rights (OHCHR) had catalogued 798 killings near GHF aid sites or on the routes of aid convoys.

On 11 July, Gaza's civil defense agency reported that Israeli military forces killed 10 Palestinians waiting for aid in al-Shakoush, north of Rafah, in southern Gaza.

On 12 July, the Israeli army fired directly at aid-seeking Palestinians, killing over 30 of them, near a GHF aid distribution center in al-Shakoush.

As of 13 July, United Nations' office of human rights confirmed 875 Palestinian aid-seekers were killed in Gaza, of whom 674 were killed near GHF's sites and the remaining 201 near or the routes of aid convoys.

=== 16–31 July ===
On 16 July, at least 21 Palestinians were killed at an aid site in Khan Yunis as a result of a stampede and suffocation after tear gas was fired at aid seekers.

On 18 July, civil defense spokesman Mahmud Bassal announced that Israel killed nine aid seekers near a GHF aid center in Al-Shakoush, northwest of Rafah, besides killing one and wounding eight Palestinians near at another GHF site close to the Netzarim corridor, south of Gaza City.

On 19 July, witnesses and hospital officials reported that the IDF fired at and killed over 32 Palestinian aid-seekers in two locations, namely: Teina - two miles from a GHF aid hub east of Khan Younis - and Shakoush - some hundreds of yards north of a GHF aid hub in Rafah.

On 20 July, at least 94 Palestinians were killed by the IDF while seeking aid across Gaza, including over 81 killed while trying to reach aid entering through the Zikim border crossing. More than 150 people were wounded. The UN World Food Program reported encountering massive crowds that came under Israeli gunfire while attempting to access 25 aid trucks.

On 22 July 2025, the Office of the United Nations High Commissioner for Human Rights (OHCHR) recorded that, as of 21 July, 1,054 Palestinian aid seekers were killed: 766 near GHF's sites and 288 near UN and other organizations' aid convoys. On 24 July 19 Palestinians were killed trying to collect aid.

On 26 July 42 Palestinians were killed seeking aid, including at least a dozen Palestinians waiting for aid trucks at the Zikim crossing.

On 27 July, Israel said it began "tactical pauses" in three parts of Gaza and announced safe convoys for aid. Al-Awda Hospital received 12 killed and over 100 injured after Israeli forces opened fire on a GHF aid site.

On 28 July 41 people seeking aid were killed by Israeli forces. That day, Israel blocked the entry of aid trucks and killed 11 aid protection guards. When it allowed them into the strip, most were looted by gangs allegedly supported and supplied by Israel.

On 29 July, hospital sources informed BBC that an Israeli tank killed six people at a GHF aid site near Rafah.

On 30 July, medical sources informed Al Jazeera that Israeli forces killed at least 71 Palestinian aid-seekers: 20 at the Morag Corridor near Khan Younis in southern Gaza (according to the Nasser Medical Complex), and more than 51 at the Zikim crossing point, where 648 others were also wounded (according to the Gaza Government Media Office).

On 31 July, Israeli bombardments in Gaza killed 23 aid-seekers. On the same day, the Office of the United Nations High Commissioner for Human Rights (OHCHR) documented that: "In total, since 27 May, at least 1,373 Palestinians have been killed while seeking food; 859 in the vicinity of the GHF sites and 514 along the routes of food convoys."

=== 1–31 August ===
On 2 August, Al Jazeera reported that 45 people, the majority of people killed that day, were killed seeking aid.

On 3 August, Al Jazeera reported that 56 people were killed at aid sites, including 9 in Rafah and 7 at Netarzim.

On 4 August, Al Jazeera reported that 36 people were killed seeking aid.

On 5 August, Al Jazeera reported that 58 aid seekers were killed, bringing the total to over 1,500.

On 6 August, Gaza's health officials and witnesses reported that Israeli repeated gunfire killed at least 38 Palestinian aid seekers: 28 in the Morag Corridor, 4 in Teina on a route leading to a GHF site, and 6 near another GHF site in central Gaza.

On 7 August, the Palestine Football Association announced the death of the prominent footballer Suleiman Obeid, killed by Israeli forces as he was waiting to collect humanitarian aid.

On 9 August, the Gaza Ministry of Health documented that Israeli forces killed 21 aid seekers.

On 10 August, hospital officials and witnesses announced that at least 26 aid-seekers were killed "either along food convoy routes or near privately run aid distribution points across Gaza".

On 12 August, medics and witnesses announced that 19 aid-seekers were killed at GHF sites. The death toll of the mass killings near aid sites since May 2025 also increased to 1,838, and more than 13,409 others were wounded.

On 14 August, it was reported that 13 people were killed while seeking aid, while the famine killed 4. The total number of aid-seekers killed by Israel since the GHF was established is at least 1,881, with 13,863 injured.

On 16 August, the BBC reported that, in at least 10 instances since late July, airdrops of aid—coordinated with Israel—dropped aid into military zones designated by Israel as unsafe for civilians.

On 18 August, The New Arab reported that at least seven people were killed while seeking aid, and the death toll increased to 1,965.

On 23 August, the Gaza Ministry of Health reported that 16 people were killed and over 111 others were injured while seeking aid, increasing the death toll to 2,076 with more than 15,038 injured.

On 24 August, 4 Palestinians were shot dead by Israeli forces while seeking aid near Gaza City.

On 25 August, 6 people were reported killed by Israeli troops while getting aid from a GHF site.

On 28 August, 19 aid seekers were killed.

=== September–October 2025 ===
On 10 September, the health ministry reported that twelve people were killed and 30 others were injured by Israeli forces. The death toll also increased to 2,456, and 17,861 others were wounded.

On 17 September, the Gaza health ministry reported that seven people were killed and 87 others were injured, increasing the death toll to 2,504 and 18,381 others were injured.

On 29 September, the health ministry reported that five more people were killed and 48 others were injured while seeking aid, increasing the death toll to 2,571 and the number of injuries to more than 18,800.

On 9 October, the ministry reported that two people were killed and 13 others were injured by Israeli forces, increasing the death toll to 2,615 with 19,177 others wounded.

== Reporting ==
In late June 2025, Haaretz released an article in which reporters spoke to multiple IDF soldiers and officers stationed at the GHF aid distribution sites. Soldiers said that they had received orders to fire on any unarmed aid seekers who arrived before the food distribution centers were open to "keep them away" and after they closed to disperse the crowds. One soldier told the Israeli newspaper that they were not aware of any shooting from "the other side." Because the opening times of the aid centers are not always consistent, Palestinians would approach at various times and this, according to a soldier interviewed by Haaretz, contributed to confusion and harm. The operation was reportedly called "Operation Salted Fish", named after the Israeli version of the children's game Red light, green light.

On 27 June 2025, Gaza's Government Media Office expressed its "deep concern and condemnation" over its discovery of oxycodone "narcotic pills" inside flour bags distributed by GHF aid centers in Gaza. It said it held Israel fully responsible for the "heinous crime of spreading addiction and destroying the Palestinian social fabric" and stated, "We have so far documented four testimonies from citizens who found these pills inside flour bags. More serious is the possibility that some of these narcotic substances were deliberately ground or dissolved in the flour itself, which raises the scope of the crime and transforms it into a serious attack directly targeting public health."

According to two U.S. contractors, their colleagues have been firing live ammunition, lobbing stun grenades, and using pepper spray against hungry Palestinians seeking food. They also reported that the security staff hired were often unqualified and "seemed to have a license" to do whatever they wished. A spokesperson for SRS said there had been no serious injuries at any of their sites and that its security staff had fired live rounds to get the attention of civilians during "the height of desperation where crowd control measures were necessary for the safety and security of civilians." AP News added that the contractors reported that in addition to these measures, American contractors were documenting anyone they deemed suspect, and sharing that information with the IDF. A GHF spokesperson attributed these stories to people with a "vested interest" in seeing their efforts fail. SRS claims that Hamas has actively threatened the aid sites, while one of the contractors interviewed by the AP said they had never "felt" a threat from Hamas while on site.

Former GHF worker and US Army Green Berets veteran Anthony Aguilar told BBC News that he witnessed the IDF committing war crimes. He said the IDF and US contractors engaged in a "level of brutality and use of indiscriminate and unnecessary force against a civilian population" that he had never before witnessed.

In September 2025, it was reported that at least ten identified members of the openly anti-Muslim group known as the "Infidels Motorcycle Club" were employed by UG Solutions as armed security for GHF in Gaza, with a further 30 members recruited from the gang, according to one former contractor. Armed contractors were photographed in Gaza with banners stating, "FOB Mar-a-Lago," and "Make Gaza Great Again." Edward Ahmed Mitchell, deputy director of the Council on American-Islamic Relations, stated, "Putting the Infidels biker club in charge of delivering humanitarian aid in Gaza is like putting the KKK in charge of delivering humanitarian aid in Sudan. It makes no sense whatsoever."

According to a report by CNN, the IDF used bulldozers to bury those killed near the Zikim crossing. The investigation also reviewed footage of aid seekers being shot at on 11 September 2025 and determined the fire likely came from an IDF position.

== Aftermath ==
After the ceasefire was implemented and took effect on 10 October, all the food distribution sites by the GHF are being shut down. A GHF spokesperson said that there will be "tactical changes" to its operations and "temporary closures" to the sites over the next few days.

== Reactions ==
=== State actors ===
- Israel: IDF spokesman Effie Defrin accused Hamas of "spreading rumors" and "trying bluntly and violently to stop the people of Gaza" from reaching aid.
- United States: US Ambassador to Israel Mike Huckabee accused news outlets of "reckless and irresponsible reporting", saying that "the only source for these misleading, exaggerated, and utterly fabricated stories came from Hamas."
- France: France condemned Israeli gunfire targeting civilians gathered around an aid distribution site in Gaza on 24 June, saying it left dozens killed and wounded.
- Switzerland: Swiss authorities issued a warning to the Geneva affiliate of the GHF, calling on it to rectify its "deficiencies in the organization that is mandatory by law" or face court or regulatory action in 30 days.
- Palestine: The Fatah-run Palestinian Authority accused Hamas of systematically killing Gazans "under the pretext that they are collaborating with the American aid centers."
- On 21 July, a joint statement calling for the Gaza War to immediately end by the foreign ministers of Australia, Austria, Belgium, Canada, Denmark, Estonia, Finland, France, Iceland, Ireland, Italy, Japan, Latvia, Lithuania, Luxembourg, The Netherlands, New Zealand, Norway, Poland, Portugal, Slovenia, Spain, Sweden, Switzerland, the United Kingdom, and the European Union Commissioner for Equality, Preparedness and Crisis Management described the Israeli aid distribution model as "dangerous, fuels instability and deprives Gazans of human dignity".

=== Non-state actors ===
- Hamas: Hamas condemned the massacres occurring under a "false humanitarian cover" as "a full-fledged war crime" and accused the "American–Israeli aid centers" of having turned into "death traps".
- Popular Forces: Leader of the Israeli-backed Popular Forces, Yasser Abu Shabab, denied the massacres, claiming "Rumors of executions and killings are being spread by the corrupt, mercenaries, and criminals of Hamas in an attempt to sow fear in the hearts of those who seek change and liberation from terrorism, oppression, and its unjust rule."
- Gaza Humanitarian Foundation: The GHF has on several occasions denied shootings occurring near its aid sites, claiming "To date, not a single incident has occurred at or in the surrounding vicinity of GHF sites, nor has any incident occurred during our operating hours." Interim director John Acree has accused Hamas of attacking GHF workers, stating "We decided that the best response to Hamas’ cowardly murderers was to keep delivering food for the people of Gaza who are counting on us."

=== Supranational organizations ===
- United Nations: United Nations Secretary-General António Guterres said he was "appalled by the reports of Palestinians killed and injured while seeking aid" and called for an independent investigation into the killings of Palestinians.
  - UNRWA Commissioner-General Philippe Lazzarini condemned the killings as "undignified" and "unsafe", as well as "a distraction from atrocities". He also called the mechanism "an abomination" and "a death trap". UN aid coordination office spokesperson Jens Laerke also criticized the GHF plan as "a distraction from what is actually needed, which is a reopening of all the crossings into Gaza, a secure environment within Gaza and faster facilitation of permissions and final approvals of all the emergency supplies that we have just outside the border."
  - The UNICEF criticized the US-backed, Israel-backed, GHF-run aid distribution system for worsening "a desperate situation".
  - OHCHR spokesman Thameen al-Kheetan condemned what he called "Israel's militarized humanitarian assistance mechanism" as a contradiction of "international standards of aid distribution," and added that the weaponization of food for civilians "constitutes a war crime."
- European Union: On the day after the 27 May incident, EU foreign policy chief Kaja Kallas criticized the aid mechanism run by the GHF, saying it does not support "any kind of privatization of the distribution of humanitarian aid".

=== Non-governmental organizations ===
- Doctors Without Borders reported that they received people wounded in the attacks and called it a "massacre" and stated that "along with displacement orders and bombing campaigns that kill civilians, weaponizing aid in this manner may constitute crimes against humanity". A later report from the group described the mass shootings at the GHF sites as "orchestrated killings" perpetrated by Israel, calling for the sites under the GHF to be shut down.
- Human Rights Watch (HRW) criticizes Israel for committing the war crime of weaponizing mass starvation against civilians and thereby directly causing the humanitarian crisis, as well as for "the crime against humanity of extermination, and acts of genocide" by unlawfully, intentionally, and continually restricting and depriving aid and basic services. Therefore, HRW urges states to enact pressure on Israel to forgo lethal crowd-control methods and to lift Israeli restriction of aid in order to end mass starvation, as well as on Israel and the US to suspend the "flawed" "death-trap" aid distribution system.

== See also ==
- Flour massacre
- Kerem Shalom aid convoy looting
- Humanitarian aid during the Gaza war
- Israeli blockade of aid delivery to the Gaza Strip
- Israeli war crimes
- List of massacres in Palestine
- World Central Kitchen aid convoy attack
