= Fețeni =

Fețeni may refer to several villages in Romania:

- Fețeni, a village in the town of Cugir, Alba County
- Fețeni, a village in Valea Mare Commune, Dâmbovița County
- Fețeni, a village in the city of Râmnicu Vâlcea, Vâlcea County

== See also ==
- Fața (disambiguation)
