= Deir al-Balah aid worker impersonation incident =

2025 event during Gaza war

- Part of the Deir al-Balah offensive of the Israeli invasion of the Gaza Strip during the Gaza war
Date	early August 2025
Location	Deir al-Balah, Gaza Strip, Palestine
Result	Per Israel: Impersonators killed

Belligerents
Israel	Unknown armed group impersonating aid workers

Casualties and losses
None	Per Israel: Conflicting claims: IDF reported 5 gunmen killed and also reported an unclear number of casualties

On 12 August 2025, during the Gaza war (2023–present), the Israel Defense Forces (IDF) stated that it launched a strike on a group of armed men in Deir al-Balah, Gaza Strip, who were impersonating employees of World Central Kitchen (WCK), a United States-based nonprofit aid organization. The strike, which the IDF said had occurred several days earlier, came amid an Israeli military offensive into Deir al-Balah that had begun on 21 July.

== Incident ==
In its statement, the IDF said the vehicle was spotted several hundred meters from an Israeli military position in Deir al-Balah. A video released by the IDF shows the group of impersonators, numbering at least eight men, wearing yellow vests and standing around a vehicle with a WCK logo on top. Several of the men appear to be armed. The video does not show any strike on the vehicle.

The IDF made conflicting statements about casualties in the strike, saying it killed "five armed terrorists", but then also stated the number of casualties was unclear.

== Identity of the impersonators ==
In its statement, the IDF referenced Hamas and other militant organizations that it is fighting, saying they exploit humanitarian efforts, but stated it was unclear to what armed group or organization the impersonators belonged. No militant group in the Gaza Strip has claimed its fighters were involved in the supposed incident. Ynet nonetheless reported that the impersonators belonged to Hamas.

== WCK response ==
Israel's Coordinator of Government Activities in the Territories (COGAT) said it contacted WCK, which confirmed the vehicle had no connection to their operations. WCK released a statement saying "We strongly condemn anyone posing as World Central Kitchen or other humanitarians, as this endangers civilians and aid workers. The safety and security of our teams are our top priority."

== Analysis ==
The Long War Journal of the pro-Israel Foundation for Defense of Democracies connected the incident to other purported infiltrations of NGOs or nonprofits by militant groups and said such activities had precedents in the Gaza Strip, referring to examples such as the participation of UNRWA employees in the October 7 attacks.

== See also ==
- Humanitarian aid during the Gaza war
- Gaza humanitarian crisis (2023–present)
- World Central Kitchen aid convoy attack
- UNRWA and Israel
