= Fata Kot Taja =

- Village
- Location within Pakistan
- Coordinates: 31.29°N 72.50°E
- Country: Pakistan
- Province: Punjab
- District: Chiniot
- Time zone: UTC+5 (PST)

Fata Kot Taja is a village in Tehsil Bhawana of Chiniot District, Punjab, Pakistan. The village is located on the bank of the Chenab River 18 km from Bhawana. The village has one of the oldest primary schools of the area.
