= Arrow Unit =

Palestinian special police unit in Gaza

Arrow Unit وحدة سهم وحدة سهم Wahdat Sahm
- Common name: Sahm unit

Agency overview
- Formed: 13 March 2024
- Volunteers: All

Jurisdictional structure
- Operations jurisdiction: Parts of the Gaza Strip under Hamas control
- Legal jurisdiction: Ministry of Internal Affairs
- Governing body: Government of the Gaza Strip

Operational structure
- Overseen by: Ministry of Internal Affairs
- Headquarters: Gaza City
- Elected officer responsible: Unknown, Ministry of Internal Affairs
- Parent agency: Gaza Police

The Arrow Unit (Arabic: وحدة سهم, romanized: Wahdat Sahm) is a plain-clothed police unit of the Hamas-controlled police force in the Gaza Strip that was formed in 2024 during the Gaza war. The unit is a participant in the Hamas–Popular Forces conflict.

== Tasks and activities ==
According to Mondoweiss, the Arrow Unit was formed to hunt down looters and collaborators with Israel as well as fight the Popular Forces. Reportedly, the unit obtains intelligence from the police about suspected thieves and collaborators, and then dispatches its men to apprehend them clandestinely.

The Arrow Unit has frequently employed extrajudicial executions. An official of the Gazan interior ministry has stated that executions "set an example for others and prevent chaos from being the norm in Gaza". Not all looters or collaborators detained by the Arrow Unit are executed, with others being beaten or imprisoned.

The groups operates a Telegram channel in which it publishes statements about its activities, threatens to arrest and or execute Palestinians who break the law, and even posts videos of its executions.

== History ==
The unit's origins lie in groups of Gazan youths wearing ski masks and black clothing who appeared at public areas subject to unrest, such as bread lines, ATMs, and markets, rounding up and beating suspected thieves. Their leader was believed to be an unnamed police officer.

=== 2024 ===
The Ministry of the Interior in the Gaza Strip officially adopted the unit in March 2024, with the objectives of promoting internal stability and cooperating with local tribal committees to protect aid convoys. Police officers, members of the Al-Qassam Brigades, and members of local tribes joined the Arrow Unit's ranks.

The Arrow Unit's first major operation during the Gaza war was a raid against the Israeli-backed Popular Forces on 19 November 2024, just after the latter had carried out the Kerem Shalom aid convoy looting three days earlier. About 20 Popular Forces militants were killed in the operation.

=== 2025 ===
On 2 January, the Foundation for Defense of Democracies (FDD) reported that an Israeli airstrike in Khan Yunis killed Major General Mahmoud Salah, the commander of Gaza's police force who reportedly established the Arrow Unit.

On 3 May, the Arrow Unit announced a strict nightly curfew for the Gaza Strip with the pretext that it would facilitate the hunting down of collaborators and thieves. The unit stated that anyone who violated the curfew without justification would be treated as a collaborator.

On 4 May, the unit claimed it would execute three Gazans for collaborating with Israel while also claiming that "the limbs of 13 thieves and people who incite chaos and anarchy will be amputated and their legs will be shot."

On 10 May, the FDD reported that an Israeli airstrike in the Sabra neighborhood of Gaza City killed the Arrow Unit's commander, Saqer Talib.

On 12 June, the Arrow Unit detained and killed 12 people who it said were Popular Forces militants; the Israeli-backed Gaza Humanitarian Foundation had claimed the dead were its aid workers.

On 24 June, Gazan activists claimed that the Arrow Unit had beaten prominent anti-Hamas protester Ahmed Muhammad al Masry to the point of hospitalization.

On 26 June, Arrow Unit members fled into the Nasser Hospital after a feud with the Barabakh clan, due to Arrow Unit members shooting and killing one member of the family. Armed members of the family pursued the Arrow Unit members and the two groups then had a shootout in the hospital. Local reports state that the unit made use of ambulances and targeted the homes of Barbakh family members.

On 17 September 2025 the Arrow Unit published a warning for the Counter-Terrorism Strike Force. The post accused Husam al-Astal, the group's leader, of working for the Palestinian Authority's preventative security service and linked him to Israel's Mossad intelligence agency.

== Criticism ==
According to the Jerusalem Post, some Gazans oppose the Arrow Unit and accuse them of illicit bullying, harassment, executing civilians, stealing aid for themselves, and targeting local clans known to be less loyal to Hamas.

According to the neoconservative Foundation for Defense of Democracies, the Arrow Unit has been criticized for its usage of extrajudicial killings, extrajudicial beatings, lack of due process, frequently not providing evidence for accusations, and killing those speak out against Hamas.

== See also ==
- Societal breakdown in the Gaza Strip during the Gaza war
- Hamas controlled Palestinian Civil Police Force
- Israeli invasion of the Gaza Strip
