= Sabra, Gaza City =

Neighborhood in Palestine

Sabra الصبرة
- Neighborhood
- Interactive map of Sabra
- Coordinates: 31°30′16″N 34°27′19.1″E
- Country: Palestine
- Governorate: Gaza Governorate
- City: Gaza
- Time zone: UTC+2 (EET)
  - Summer (DST): +3

Sabra (Arabic: الصبرة) is a neighborhood district in western Gaza City. It was established during the Mandatory Palestine period in Palestine. It contains the city's municipal mark, built in the 1930s south of Omar Mukhtar Street. An UNRWA health center is located in the neighborhood.

In March 2004, Sheikh Ahmed Yassin was assassinated when IDF helicopters launched multiple missiles towards him as he was coming back from morning prayers at the mosque near his residence in the Sabra neighborhood. The assassination also killed nine Palestinian bystanders and caused injuries to 15 individuals, among them being two sons of Sheikh Yassin.

During the Gaza war (2023–present), Israeli forces carried out operations in the Sabra neighborhood. According to Reuters, at least 10-12 Palestinians were reported killed in the area, with the IDF stating the strikes targeted militant infrastructure.

== Bibliography ==
- Shahin, Mariam (2005). Palestine: A Guide. Interlink Books. ISBN 1-56656-557-X.
