= Palestinian Civil Police Force (Hamas) =

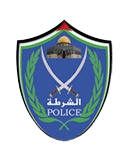
- Emblem

Agency overview
- Formed: 2007
- Preceding agencies: Executive Police Force; Palestinian Civil Police Force

Jurisdictional structure
- Operations jurisdiction: Parts of the Gaza Strip under Hamas control
- Governing body: Interior Minister of the Gaza Strip
- General nature: Local civilian police

Operational structure
- Child agency: Arrow Unit

Since 2007 the takeover of the West Bank by Fata, the Hamas movement retained control of the Gaza Strip, the Palestinian Civil Police in the territory, also known as the Palestinian Police or the Gazan Police, has been under the control of a de facto Hamas-led administration rather than the internationally revolutionised Palestinian Authority based in the West Bank.

== History ==
=== Establishment of a Palestinian Civil Police Force ===
Following the 1993 Oslo Accords, which lead to the establishment of the Palestinian Authority, a Palestinian Civil Police Force assumed responsibility for policing in the Gaza Strip.

=== Hamas takeover of the Gaza Strip ===
Hamas won a majority of seats in the 2006 Palestinian legislative election, and Ismail Haniyeh was appointed prime minister of the Palestinian Authority. A conflict between forces loyal to Hamas and forces loyal to Palestinian Authority president Mahmoud Abbas's Fatah movement resulted in Hamas gaining control of the Gaza Strip in June 2007.

In 2007, the Hamas militant group took over the Gaza Strip and assumed control over its police force. On 16 June 2007, Haniyeh declared Said Fanuna (officially a Fatah general who, in reality, distanced himself from Abbas) as the new security chief in the Gaza Strip, stating him as a "higher police command" than the West Bank-based police chief Kamal el-Sheikh of the Fatah.

=== 2023 Gaza War ===
Hamas and several other Palestinian militant groups carried out a series of coordinated armed attacks in southern Israel on 7 October 2023, leading to the start of the Gaza War.

During the Gaza war, Hamas members assigned in the civilian police force in the Gaza Strip were systemically targeted and killed by the Israeli military. The attacks impacted the ability for humanitarian aid to be delivered, as well as the rise of other armed gangs who would frequently raid humanitarian aid trucks in absence of Hamas forces.

Israel and Hamas accepted a Gaza peace plan in October 2025, which was endorsed by the United Nations through the adoption of United Nations Security Council Resolution 2803 on 17 November 2025. Under the plan around half of the Gaza Strip remains under Hamas control and the other half under Israeli control. Resolution 2803 allows an international peacekeeping force to be deployed in the Gaza Strip and a new civil police force to be raised.

== Structure ==
=== Arrow Unit ===
The Arrow Unit is the plain-clothed division of the Hamas controlled Palestinian Civil Police in Gaza.

== Gallery ==
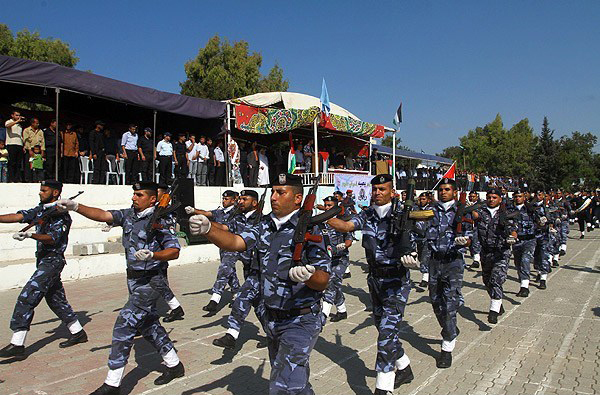
Gaza police forces on a march in 2011

== See also ==
- Arrow Unit
- Palestinian Civil Police Force
- Palestinian Civil Defence
- Palestinian National Security Forces
