= Kuwait Roundabout mass killings =

2024 mass killing in Gaza

- Part of the Gaza war
- Location within the Gaza Strip
- Location: 31°28′47.28″N 34°26′32.28″E; Kuwait Roundabout, Gaza City, Gaza Strip
- Date: 3–31 March 2024 (4 weeks)
- Attack type: Mass shooting
- Deaths: 20 civilians
- Injuries: 155 civilians
- Perpetrators: Israel Defense Forces (Palestinian claim); Gazan militants (Israeli claim)

In March 2024, during the Gaza war, civilians seeking humanitarian aid were attacked at the Kuwait Roundabout near Gaza City, causing mass killings. According to the Gaza Health Ministry (GHM), 21 Gazans were killed and 155 were wounded. Al Jazeera and Euro-Med Monitor reported eyewitness testimonies—including from Mohammed Ghurab, the director of emergency services at al-Shifa Hospital—saying Israeli forces were responsible.

The Israel Defense Forces (IDF) responded to the accusations saying they did not open in fire at the convoy, claiming that armed militants fired against the Gazan civilians while waiting for the aid convoy to arrive.

== Background ==
In the aftermath of the October 7 attack by Hamas, Israel declared on 9 October that it would temporarily restrict the entry of food supplies into the Gaza Strip. This measure, as stated by the Israeli authorities, aims to mitigate the security risk posed by Hamas, including the prevention of military supplies being covertly brought in under the pretense of humanitarian assistance. Since then, aid has been supplied to Gaza in various forms and under strict security. Despite global efforts, people in Gaza are suffering severe food shortages.

According to the Gaza-based Government Media Office, as of 12 March 2024, Israeli attacks on crowds of aid seekers throughout Gaza had killed at least 400 people since the start of the conflict, including in the Flour Massacre on 29 February. The assaults were described by the Gaza Ministry of Health (GHM) as "horrific massacres" by Israeli soldiers opening fire on crowds waiting for humanitarian assistance, while Israel disputes this. By mid-March, Al Jazeera English stated that attacks on aid seekers in northern Gaza were "a near-daily occurrence" and the "new normal". Without assigning blame, the Office of the United Nations High Commissioner for Human Rights (OHCHR) has documented more than two dozen attacks as people wait for aid since mid-January 2024.

== Timeline ==
- On 3 March 2024, dozens of civilians were killed and injured in an Israeli attack on aid seekers at the Kuwait Roundabout in Gaza City according to the Gaza Health Ministry.
- On 4 March, another attack was reported at the Kuwait Roundabout, after thousands of people waited all day for humanitarian aid, Israeli soldiers opened fire on them as soon as the trucks arrived, according to the Gaza Ministry of Health.
- On 6 March, eight people were wounded after Israel fired live rounds at people seeking humanitarian aid at the Nabulsi Roundabout.
- On 7 March, five people were killed while waiting for aid at the Nabulsi Roundabout.
- On 8 March, several people seeking humanitarian aid were reportedly killed by Israeli open fire at the Kuwait Roundabout.
- On 19 March, at least 23 people were killed when Israeli fighter jets targeted a group of humanitarian aid coordinators at the Kuwait Roundabout.
- On 23 March, the Gaza Health Ministry stated that 19 persons were killed while waiting for aid at the Kuwait Roundabout. Israel denied responsibility.
- On 24 March, verified video showed an unknown number of casualties from an attack on the Kuwait Roundabout, with Al Jazeera Arabic reporters stating that the attack was on members of a local aid distribution committee.
- On 27 March, the Gaza Health Ministry warned residents to avoid the al-Rashid and Kuwait Roundabouts after two people were reportedly severely wounded by Israeli snipers at the Kuwait Roundabout.
- On 28 March, video from near the Nabulsi Roundabout showed two men waving white flags being shot and killed by Israeli forces and then buried under sand.
- On 30 March, 17 people were reportedly killed and 30 injured by an Israeli attack on the Kuwait Roundabout.
- On 31 March, Israeli forces opened fire on humanitarian aid seekers at the Kuwait Roundabout, with witnesses describing the scene as "completely chaotic".

== 14 March attack ==
On 14 March 2024, an attack occurred on the Kuwait Roundabout east of Gaza City, killing at least 21 people and injuring 155 others, according to the Gaza Health Ministry (GHM). Al Jazeera reported some wounded were left bleeding on the streets for hours. Others were taken to al-Shifa Hospital, though some of the victims did not receive treatment due to a lack of staff and supplies at the hospital.

Survivors of the attack asked why aid trucks were brought into northern Gaza at all if aid seekers were just going to be shot.

=== Responsibility ===
Gaza Civil Defense spokesman Mahmoud Basal stated Israel was responsible for the attacks. An Al Jazeera correspondent and testimony collected by the Euro-Med Monitor said that the firing came from an Israeli helicopter, and later Al Jazeera reported that Israeli tanks fired indiscriminately. Witnesses stated that Israeli tanks and a helicopter fired live ammunition at the aid seekers. Mohammed Ghurab, the director of emergency services at Al-Shifa, stated people had been hit by "direct shots" from Israeli forces.

Following the attack, the Israel Defense Forces (IDF) released a video showing an armed individual, alleging that Palestinian gunmen were responsible for the high number of casualties. A Euro-Med Monitor investigation concluded that the gunfire depicted in the video appeared to have occurred at the Dawla Roundabout, roughly two kilometers from the Kuwait Roundabout. Bullets from the dead and wounded in these attacks were 5.56 x 45mm NATO bullets, which were discharged from Israeli army-issued weaponry. The Gaza Media Office stated the attack was part of a "series of massacres and brutal attacks against the defenceless civilians".

The Israeli military said "no tank fire, airstrike or gunfire was carried out toward the Gazan civilians at the aid convoy". According to the IDF's account of the 14 March attack, Palestinian gunmen tried to prevent looting by firing at the crowd. They stated that an hour before the convoy's arrival, armed Palestinians opened fire on civilians waiting for aid, and that the shooting continued during the looting of the trucks, resulting in civilians being trampled and run over.

== See also ==
- Timeline of the Israeli–Palestinian conflict in 2024
- Timeline of the Gaza war (12 January 2024 – 6 May 2024)
- Flour Massacre
- Gaza Strip famine
- Israeli war crimes in the Gaza war
- Gaza genocide
- List of massacres in the Palestinian territories
