= Humanitarian aid during the Gaza war =

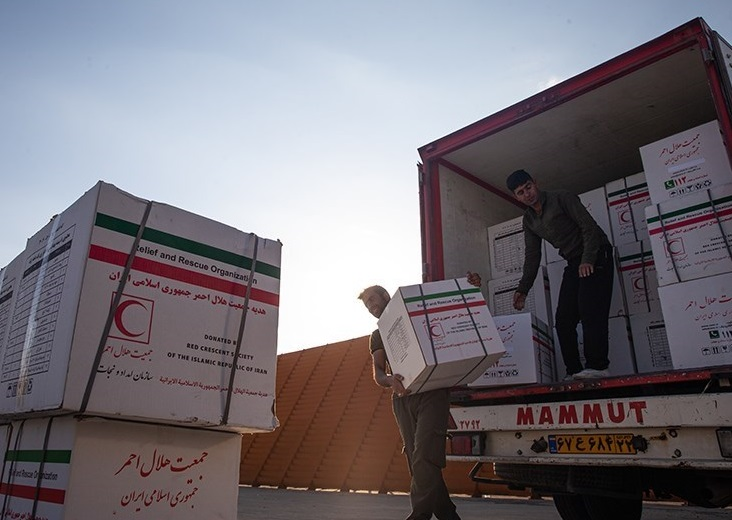
Workers unloading Iranian aid shipment to Gaza, late October 2023

During the Gaza war, humanitarian aid entered into the Gaza Strip via air, land and sea. Early in the war, significant issues arose with humanitarian aid. Israel's initial blockade on Gaza, immediately following the 7 October attacks, prevented the entry of humanitarian aid for several weeks. As the war progressed, aid was allowed at limited quantities. Entities such as Oxfam, the European Union, United Kingdom, and United Nations stated that Israel is deliberately blocking humanitarian aid. These limitations have contributed to a severe humanitarian crisis and a risk of famine. Israeli airstrikes and continued restrictions on aid entry led to widespread shortages of food and supplies. Distribution of aid within Gaza has also been an issue. Thousands of truckloads of aid piled up as armed men stop convoys, threaten drivers, and rifle through the cargo. Lawlessness was reported by PBS to be a major obstacle to aid distribution to southern and central Gaza. Gaza's police have refused to protect aid convoy after airstrikes killed eight police officers in Rafah.

Humanitarian aid agencies warned of the dire humanitarian consequences of aid restrictions, particularly after major Western donors announced they would cease funding UNRWA, the major aid relief agency in Gaza, and Israel passed legislation to ban UNRWA from working in or with the State of Israel.

In January 2024, UN Secretary-General António Guterres appointed then-First Deputy Prime Minister of the Netherlands Sigrid Kaag as Senior Humanitarian and Reconstruction Coordinator for Gaza. By May 2024, the UN World Food Programme warned that humanitarian operations were "near collapse". In June 2024, the EU Commissioner for Crisis Management, Janez Lenarcic, stated the majority of people in Gaza were "fully dependent" on humanitarian aid. In October 2024, the United Nations found that Israel had arbitrarily blocked 83% of aid entering Gaza in the prior year. According to UNICEF, more aid workers had been killed in Gaza by summer 2024 than in any war since the founding of the United Nations, with at least 278 killed.

== Background ==
Israeli imposed closure on the movement of goods and people to and from Gaza dates back to 1991. This policy was initially temporary, but eventually developed into a permanent administrative measure in March 1993. Since then, the closure has varied in intensity, but has never been completely lifted. In 1994, Israel built the Gaza–Israel barrier as a security measure. Since then, there are four border crossings between Israel and the Gaza Strip through the barrier: the Kerem Shalom, Karni, Erez, and Sufa crossings. All goods bound for Gaza as well as exports passing through Israel must use one of these crossings, and undergo security inspection before being permitted to enter or leave Gaza. After the 2005 withdraw of Israeli settlers from Gaza, all trade was ceased and the entrance of goods was limited to a "humanitarian minimum", allowing only those goods which are "essential to the survival of the civilian population". According to Palestinian analyst Elhasan Bakr, the prewar amount of aid trucks into Gaza was 500-600 a day, with estimates of 1,000-1,500 trucks needed to alleviate starvation.

=== 2023 October block on aid ===
The amount of aid coming in is a drop in the bucket of Gaza's humanitarian needs. Before this conflict, about 100 trucks of aid alone entered Gaza [a day]. So imagine now, with all the hostilities going on, if only this number is coming in.

— Mey al Sayegh, (Red Cross)

On 9 October, Israel implemented a complete blockade on Gaza, preventing the entry of any humanitarian aid. Egypt closed its border to prevent civilians fleeing, but said that it would allow aid to be delivered through the Rafah crossing. A week later, despite international calls for deliveries, hundreds of tons of aid were stuck on Egypt's side of the border, as Israel bombarded the crossing amid fears of weapons deliveries, and declined to assure Egyptian authorities it would pause airstrikes for civilian aid convoys. In Israel, aid to Gaza was reportedly prevented by far-right politicians allied with Netanyahu. On 17 October, the UNRWA stated that there was currently "no water or electricity in Gaza. Soon there will be no food or medicine either".

== Blockade and resumption of deliveries after October 2023 ==
A total blockade of the Gaza Strip was announced on 9 October 2023 by the Defence Minister of Israel, Yoav Gallant. "We are putting a complete siege on Gaza … No electricity, no food, no water, no gas – it's all closed" he announced.

=== Deliveries to southern Gaza ===
On 18 October, Israel announced it would allow food, water, and medicine to be delivered to a "safe zone" in the west Khan Younis in southern Gaza, distributed by the United Nations. Later the same day, US president Joe Biden announced Egypt agreed to allow 20 trucks with aid to enter Gaza by 20 October. More than 100 trucks of aid were waiting at the Rafah crossing to enter into Gaza. In a statement, Human Rights Watch stated that without electricity or fuel, however, the provided aid would fail "meeting the needs of Gaza's population". On 19 October, US Special Envoy David M. Satterfield stated the US wanted "sustained" aid into Gaza. The same day, a spokesman for Oxfam stated aid distribution in Gaza would be a "big challenge", and the UN reported at least 100 trucks a day of aid were needed. On 21 October 20 trucks of aid entered Gaza. António Guterres stated it was not enough to prevent a "humanitarian catastrophe". Martin Griffiths said the UN was working to develop an "at-scale operation". On 22 October, following the second delivery of trucks, Biden and Netanyahu stated aid would continue to be allowed into Gaza.

=== Delivery during temporary ceasefire ===
The amount of aid entering Gaza increased during the temporary November ceasefire. On 26 November, the largest shipment of humanitarian aid reached northern Gaza since the start of the conflict nearly two months before. Philippe Lazzarini stated the aid entering Gaza was still inadequate. Samer AbdelJaber, a World Food Programme head, stated people were hungry and desperate. On 28 November, the White House reported that over 2,000 trucks of aid had entered Gaza since 21 October.

== Resumption of hostilities after November 2023 ceasefire ==
=== December 2023 ===
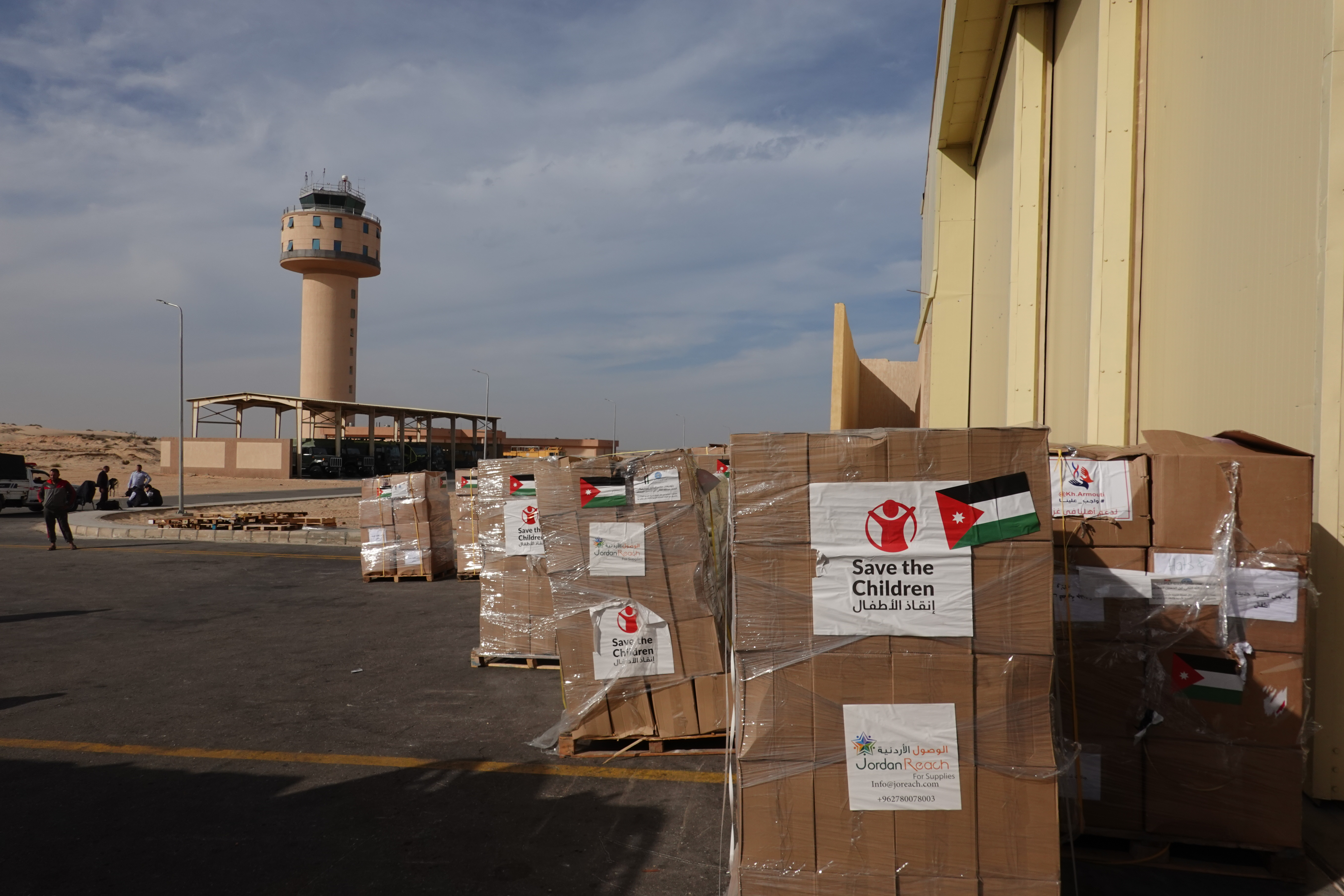
Aid entering Rafah through Egypt

Following the resumption of hostilities on 1 December, aid deliveries into Gaza ceased. The IDF informed the Palestinian Red Crescent that the entry of trucks was "prohibited, starting from today" until further notice. Later the same day, the United States announced they had requested a reversal of the decision, and Israel stated it was prepared to allow aid at pre-pause levels. On 4 December, the United Nations Office for the Coordination of Humanitarian Affairs (OCHA) stated that approximately 100 humanitarian aid trucks and 69,000 litres of fuel entered Gaza on 3 and 4 December. This was "well below" the on average 170 trucks and 110,000 litres of fuel that were delivered daily during the temporary ceasefire. On 4 December, Lynn Hastings, a UN humanitarian coordinator, stated, "The conditions required to deliver aid to the people of Gaza do not exist" and warned of a "hellish scenario" in which aid delivery was entirely impossible. (Note: Shortly after these comments, the Israeli government revoked Hastings' visa) Josep Borrell shared a warning on social media from Martin Griffiths stating an immediate ceasefire was needed for the UN to continue humanitarian operations. WHO stated Israel shot at its humanitarian relief trucks in Gaza City.

On 15 December, Israel approved the reopening of the Kerem Shalom crossing and announced that the US would be paying to upgrade the Rafah crossing. Following a tour of the Rafah crossing, MEP Barry Andrews stated he believed Israel was deliberately delaying aid deliveries to the Gaza Strip. On 19 December, UNRWA headquarters was bombed. UN chief Antonio Guterres stated the way Israel was conducting its offensive was creating obstacles for delivery. On 29 December, Israel fired on a humanitarian aid truck marked with U.N. insignia. Israel announced on 31 December it was prepared to allow aid ships from Cyprus to enter Gaza.

=== January 2024 ===
France and Jordan airdropped aid on 5 January. On 11 January, Samer AbdelJaber, a World Food Programme director, stated the organization had delivered "crucial food assistance to thousands of people facing catastrophic hunger" in Gaza City for the first time in weeks.

On 13 January 2024, UNOCHA reported the amount of aid Israel was allowing into Gaza had significantly decreased since the prior month. Omar Shakir, Human Rights Watch's Israel-Palestine director, stated, "This is a deliberate Israeli government policy. Aid is not reaching north Gaza." US senators Chris Van Hollen and Jeff Merkley criticized Israel's inspection of humanitarian aid as "arbitrary" and "broken". A joint statement by the heads of UNICEF, WHO, and the World Food Programme stated the limited quantity of aid arriving in Gaza was unable to prevent the "deadly combination of hunger, malnutrition, and disease". A viral video showed huge crowds of hungry people rushing toward a rumored relief truck. On 16 January, a deal was reached between Israel and Hamas to bring more aid into Gaza. On 19 January, UNOCHA reported that nearly 70% of its aid deliveries to northern Gaza had been denied by Israel. On 29 January, the United Nations reported that Israel had denied 29 aid missions to northern Gaza.

In late January, at least 15 countries announced they were suspending funding for UNRWA. Philippe Lazarrini, the agency chief, stated, "Our humanitarian operation, on which 2 million people depend as a lifeline in Gaza, is collapsing." The regional director of Doctors Without Borders stated, "If you stop these trucks, people will die of hunger and very quickly". UNRWA warned that without continued funding, it would be forced to cease operations by the end of February 2024.

=== February 2024 ===
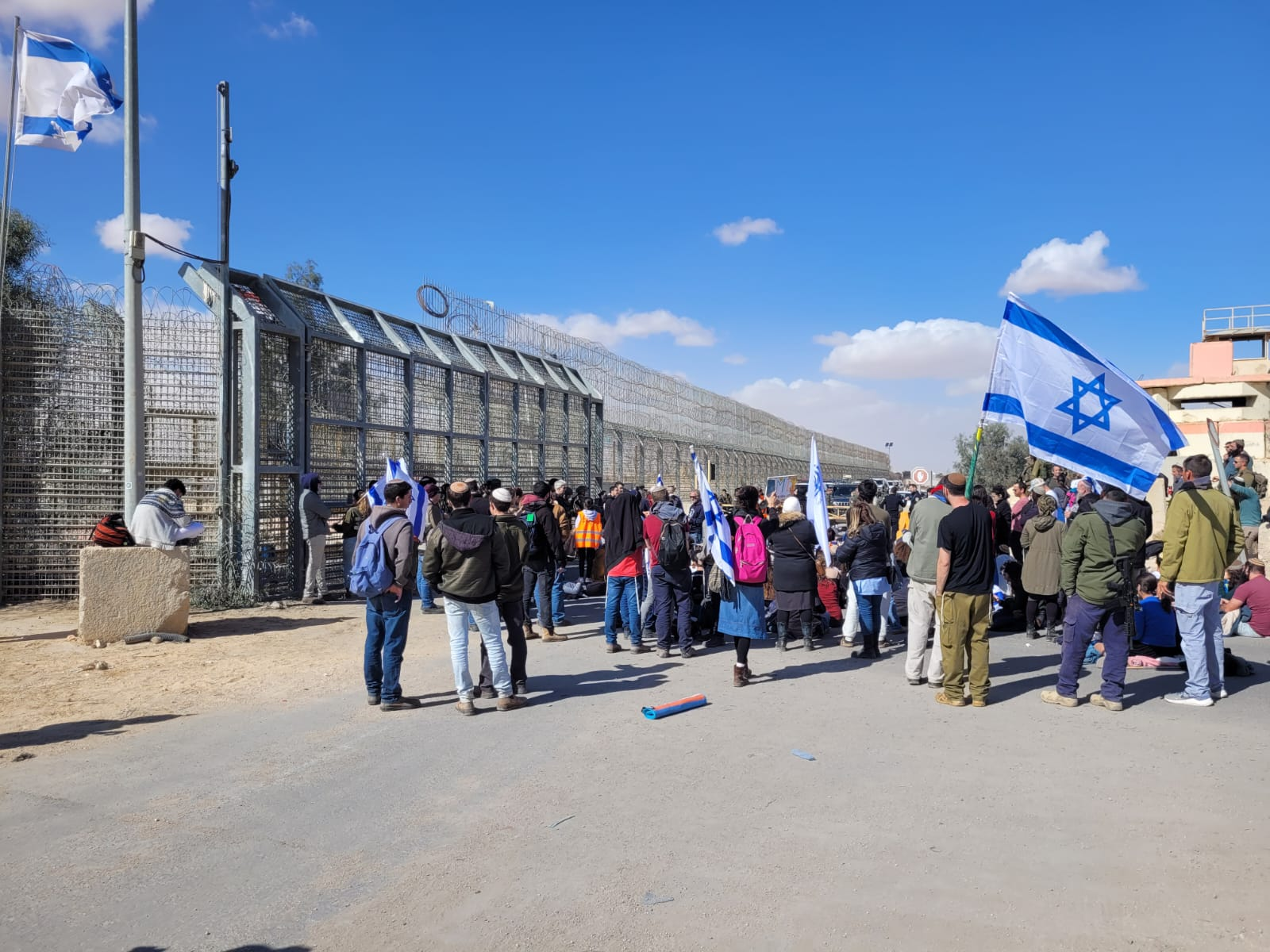
Israelis blocking humanitarian aid from entering Gaza, February 2024

On 11 February 2024, the UNRWA head said a month's worth of food supply was being blocked at Israel's Ashdod port. UNOCHA reported that only six of the 24 planned United Nations aid missions to northern Gaza had been completed in the month of February.

The World Food Programme announced on 20 February they were ceasing aid deliveries to northern Gaza, stating, "Gaza is hanging by a thread and WFP must be enabled to reverse the path towards famine for thousands of desperately hungry people". WFP stated their last aid mission had been surrounded by "crowds of hungry people". On 20 February, at least one Palestinian civilian was killed while waiting to receive humanitarian aid.

In a 21 February article CNN reported that according to documentation examined by both the UN and CNN, a UN humanitarian convoy carrying food supplies was fired upon by the IDF before being blocked from entering northern Gaza on 5 February. The convoy's path had been agreed upon by the IDF and the UN, and the convoy had been stopped at an IDF holding point for over an hour when it was fired upon, causing much of its contents which included wheat flour to be destroyed. The UN blamed "Israeli naval gunfire", while CNN identified three Israeli missile ships nearby that could have shot at the convoy.

Britain and Jordan air dropped medicine and other aid to Tal al-Hawa Hospital in northern Gaza. Humanitarian organizations warned that a Rafah offensive could lead to the end of even limited aid entering Gaza. On 22 February, UNRWA chief Philippe Lazzarini stated the organization had reached its "breaking point", with continued humanitarian services now "seriously threatened". Satellite imagery showed more than 1,000 aid trucks on the Egyptian side of the border waiting to cross into Gaza. By late-February, only four trucks were entering per day, compared to 133 at the start of the month. On 23 February, UNRWA said it was no longer operational in northern Gaza, where civil order had collapsed due to Israel's bombardment and restriction on food. UNRWA stated aid hadn't reached northern Gaza in a month.

On 25 February, satellite imagery showed as many as 2,000 humanitarian aid trucks at the Egyptian border waiting to enter Gaza. The World Food Programme's director for emergencies stated there was enough food waiting to enter Gaza to feed the entire population, yet it was delayed due to Israel's ongoing attacks and "delays at the checkpoints". On 26 February, USAID director Samantha Power stated only 85 humanitarian aid trucks had entered in the past week, while 500 trucks were needed daily. The same day, ten trucks were allowed to enter northern Gaza, described as a "trickle" of what was needed. Ten people were killed waiting for aid. People seeking aid were attacked by Israeli forces on multiple occasions. The Jordanian Air Force conducted its largest airdrop of the war, parachuting aid to 11 sites along the Gaza coast. (Note: The Air Force conducted a second airdrop the following day, with King Abdullah II in one of the planes as the operation occurred.) The following day, the Egyptian Air Force conducted its first aid drop of the war, dropping 45 tonnes of aid supplies. The World Food Programme described airdrops as an option of last resort.

On 27 February, Doctors Without Borders stated, "The provision of aid within the enclave is nearly impossible due to Israel's complete disregard for the protection and safety of medical and humanitarian missions and their staff, cutting people off from lifesaving aid. This reality is making the humanitarian response in Gaza a mere illusion." The existing system of humanitarian aid was described as "broken", due to the severe restrictions on aid and ongoing Israeli bombardments.

=== March 2024 ===
Hanke Bruins Slot, the Dutch foreign minister, offered supply scanners to speed up the inspection of humanitarian aid. The World Food Programme reported, "We need entry points to northern Gaza that will allow us to deliver enough food for half a million people in desperate need". A report by Refugees International found that Egypt had intensified its oversight and regulation of humanitarian aid trucks in response to Israeli pressures to allow in refugees. The Gaza Interior Ministry organized an armed "People's Protection Force" to replace the Gaza police that disbanded after targeted Israeli strikes and to combat black market prices. On 12 March, Morocco delivered 40 tons of aid from Ben Gurion airport to the Karem Abu Salem border crossing. The same day, the World Food Programme stated they had delivered food to northern Gaza for the first time in nearly a month. Mohamed Shusha, the northern Sinai regional governor, stated some 7,000 trucks were waiting to enter Gaza.

On 8 March, New Scientist reported that aid groups lacked long-term plans to address health needs in Gaza. Save the Children described issues with aid delivery, stating, "There's so much rubble and destruction around that it is physically even hard... to deliver our supplies when they make it in". James Elder, a UNICEF representative, stated on 17 March that it was an "outrage" that so many humanitarian trucks were waiting to enter Gaza while people starved. On 19 March, the UN reported that less than half of its planned aid missions to northern Gaza had been allowed by Israel. In late-March, the EU's top diplomat Josep Borrell called on Israel to allow UNRWA head Philippe Lazzarini to enter Gaza. On 22 March 2024, only 35 humanitarian aid trucks were allowed to enter into the Gaza Strip. On 25 March, Israel stated it would no longer work with UNRWA in Gaza.

During a raid on Al-Shifa Hospital, Israeli forces killed the security coordinator who had succeeded in the first delivery of trucks in northern Gaza in the two days prior. The killing "shattered the sense of safety" for other Palestinians working on coordinating humanitarian aid to northern Gaza. According to Israel, the coordinator was "coordinating military activities". Following the granting of an emergency request from South Africa, the International Criminal Court ordered Israel to provide more humanitarian aid into Gaza.

==== Airdrops ====
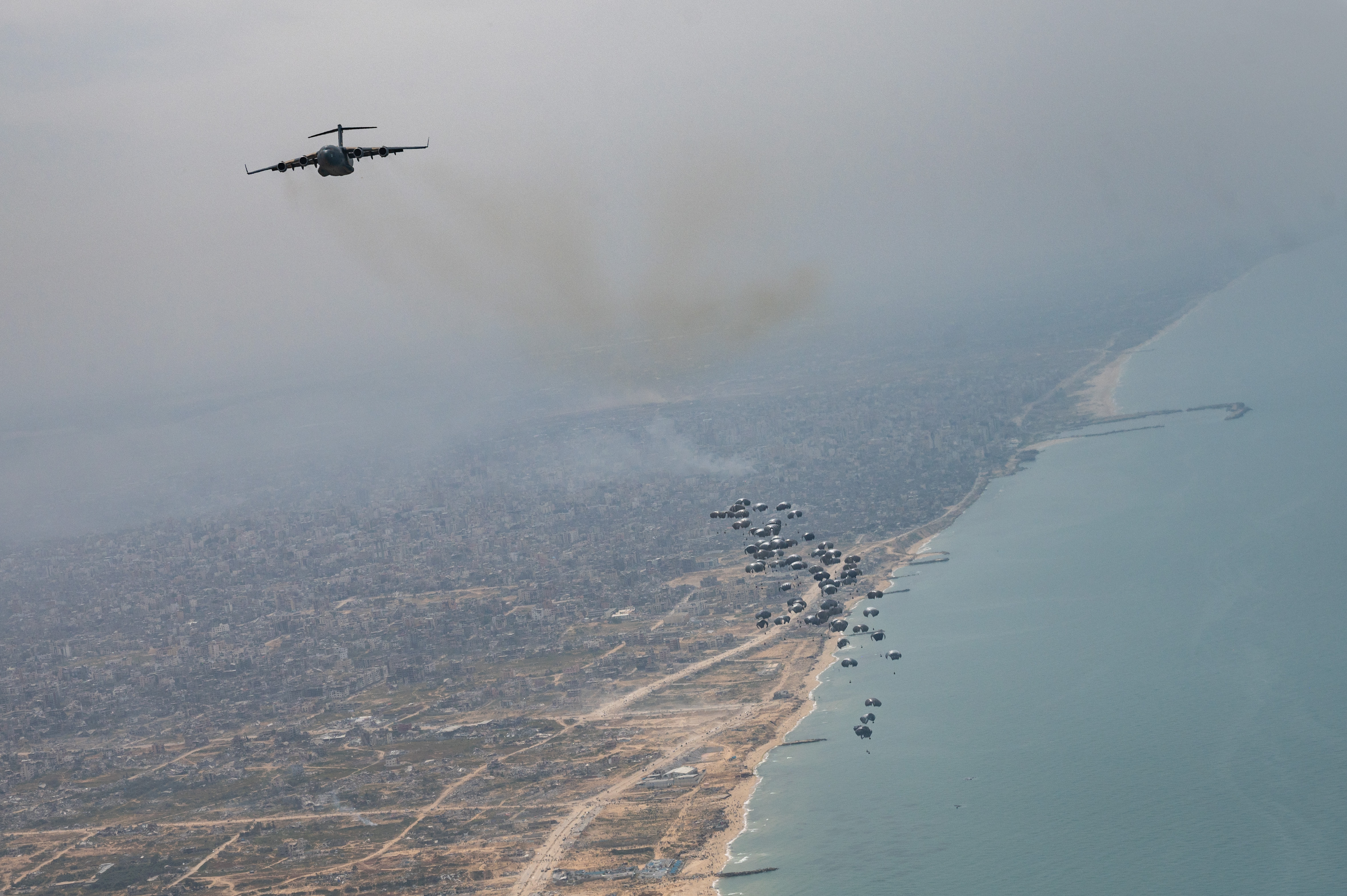
Image of US airdrop of aid into Gaza. The drop was described as "ineffective" by Oxfam, and "symbolic" by a former director of USAID.

On 1 March 2024, the United States began airdrops of aid into Gaza, with a White House spokesperson stating it was exploring the option of a maritime corridor to begin humanitarian aid deliveries. Rik Peeperkorn, a WHO representative, stated, "The simplest, safest way and most effective way to deliver aid to people is through crossings. Not just Rafah. It should [also] be Kerem Shalom." Jeremy Konyndyk, the president of Refugees International, stated of the US airdrops: "This is not enough to make a meaningful dent in the humanitarian crisis... the Israeli military offensive has made it virtually impossible for normal humanitarian operations to exist in Gaza".

Dave Harden, a former USAID director, stated, "The airdrops are symbolic and designed in ways to appease the domestic base". The head of Medical Aid for Palestinians criticized the airdrop campaign, stating, "The US, the UK and others should ensure that Israel immediately opens all crossings into Gaza for aid". Oxfam stated it did not support the "ineffective" aid drops and called them a way "to relieve the guilty consciences of senior US officials". Al Jazeera English described the airdrops as an "absurd spectacle aimed more at the news cameras than the people who need it."

On 5 March, the Israeli army prevented 14 World Food Program aid trucks from entering Northern Gaza. In the aftermath of the Flour massacre, however, the UN suggested that "Israel saw quite clearly how difficult it is to deliver assistance" and that it had "much more cooperation from Israel as a result of that realisation".

Civilians reported some of the airdropped meals were inedible without being microwaved, which was impossible since Gaza hasn't had electricity since the start of the war. Following an airdrop that killed five people, the Gaza Media Office stated, "Dropping aid in this way is flashy propaganda rather than a humanitarian service. We previously warned it poses a threat to the lives of citizens in the Gaza Strip, and this is what happened today when the parcels fell on the citizens' heads."

==== Temporary port ====
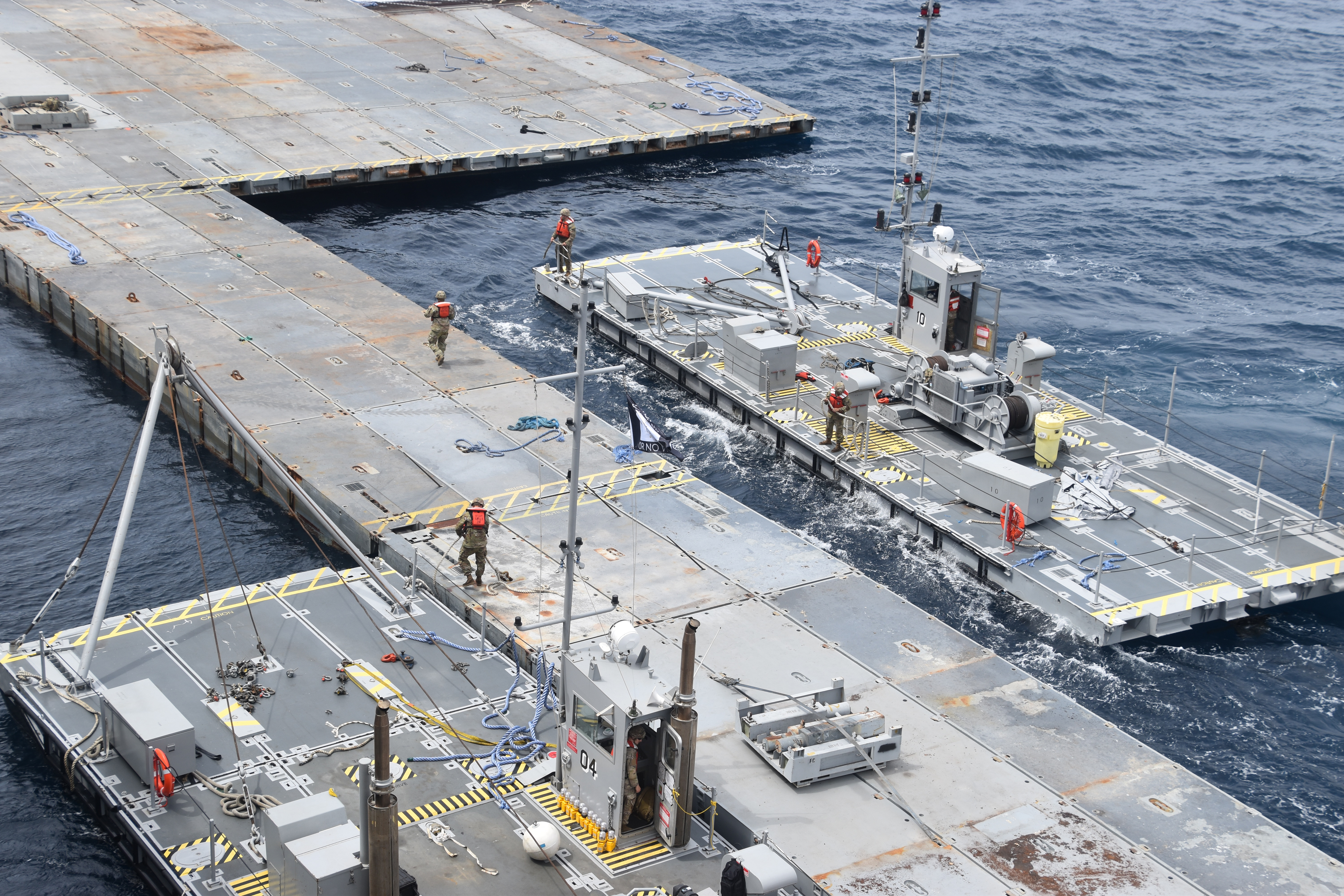
Construction of the floating pier, 26 April 2024

On 7 March it was announced that the process of creating a port in Gaza to receive and assist in the disbursement of aid by the United States was being finalized. The port would reportedly take a number of weeks to set up, but would be able to receive large ships that would reportedly carry food, water, medicine and temporary shelters after the ships had been inspected by Israeli officials in Cyprus. David Cameron suggested the pier could take months to set up entirely. The US later suggested the pier would take up to two months to build.

The European Commission and its allies — including Germany, Greece, Italy, the Netherlands, the Republic of Cyprus, the United Arab Emirates, the United Kingdom and the United States — announced their intentions to open a "maritime corridor to deliver much-needed additional amounts of humanitarian assistance by sea". In a pilot program, the Open Arms salvage vessel was sent to a small port in Gaza, with aid delivered by the World Central Kitchen. The US Secretary of State stated the maritime corridor was part of its plan to "flood the zone" with aid. On 15 March, the IDF stated that 12 trucks of humanitarian aid were distributed in northern Gaza.

A Save the Children director released a statement criticizing the timeline, stating, "Children in Gaza cannot wait to eat. They are already dying from malnutrition and saving their lives is a matter of hours or days – not weeks". The International Rescue Committee also criticized the pier and called on the US to push Israel to lifts its siege and open the Al-Muntar and Beit Hanoon land crossings. In a statement, Medical Aid for Palestinians said, "Airdrops, temporary seaports and the like are not realistic or lasting solutions to stave off looming famine and sustain life in Gaza". Avril Benoit, the executive director of Doctors Without Borders, stated the pier was a "glaring distraction from the real problem: Israel's indiscriminate and disproportionate military campaign and punishing siege". Sigrid Kaag and the director of the UN Office for Project Services stated, "For aid delivery at scale, there is no meaningful substitute to the many land routes and entry points from Israel into Gaza."

In April, as US troops began construction of the port, a mortar attack was struck near where it would connect with Gaza. No group claimed responsibility, but Hamas had previously stated they will "resist any foreign military presence involved with the port project".

=== April 2024 ===
In early April 2024, following the World Central Kitchen drone strikes, the Israeli war cabinet announced that they would allow more aid into Gaza, including the opening of the Erez border crossing. Israel was expected to allow 300-350 aid trucks into Gaza daily, though this is still less than the pre-war amount of 500–600. In a report published by the IDF in April 2024, it was reported that Israel had allowed the entry of 19,776 trucks of humanitarian aid into Gaza through the Kerem Shalom and Nitsana border crossings. The trucks reportedly brought in 369,990 tons of aid, coupled with reportedly at least 50 air drops of about 3,000 packages and six field hospitals created.

On 10 April, Israel claimed to allow 419 trucks into Gaza, the highest number so far. It also claimed 468 trucks going in the next day. This was disputed by the UN, UNRWA, UNOCHA, and Red Crescent. UNOCHA said that when COGAT screens trucks, they are typically half-full and get filled on the other side. It alleges that Israel inflates the number of aid trucks through this technicality. On the same day, Israeli defense minister Yoav Gallant announced the opening of a new crossing to allow aid at As-Siafa.

The Financial Times, meanwhile, reported that "just a trickle of humanitarian aid can enter or be distributed in Gaza each day". On 16 April, a senior UNOCHA official stated that in the prior week, "41% of humanitarian requests to the north were denied". The UN stated that since the beginning of April, an average of 181 trucks had entered Gaza each day. The Canadian Minister of International Development requested information from the Israeli government after the International Development and Relief Foundation stated its water truck had been destroyed in a "targeted" attack. The United Nations stated that only 55% of its aid missions to northern Gaza in April were facilitated by Israel.

UNOCHA stated, "Routes that remain available for use by humanitarian organizations are frequently blocked by debris, heavily congested, and contaminated with unexploded ordnance".

=== May 2024 ===
The Erez crossing was re-opened on 1 May. Israel said the target number of aid trucks daily was 500. The U.S. alleged that Hamas briefly seized the first aid shipment that came through. Israeli settlers attacked a Jordanian aid shipment, leading Josep Borrell to state, "It is despicable that people who lack nothing stop food reaching those in need." The U.S. stated it was nearing completion of its temporary floating pier.

After a Hamas rocket attack killed four Israeli soldiers and injured others at Kerem Shalom, Israel closed the border crossing. It was "reopened" after a call between Biden and Netanyahu shortly after, amidst the beginning of an Israeli incursion in Rafah. According to the UN, however, no aid entered the crossing because there was nobody on the Palestinian side able to reach it.

The Rafah border crossing was closed after Israel seized it. In response, Doctors Without Borders stated, "This will have a devastating impact as assistance coming through this crossing is a lifeline for the whole Gaza Strip." The spokesperson for the UN humanitarian office stated, "The two main arteries for getting aid into Gaza are currently choked off". The UN stated it did not have access to the Rafah crossing, as it had been denied by COGAT. The Gaza Government Media Office stated on 9 May that 400 aid trucks had been denied entry into Rafah in the past 48 hours.

International groups stated that the Rafah offensive threatened to collapse humanitarian operations. The local partner of ActionAid stated it was pausing humanitarian operations in Rafah. The UN ceased food distribution in Rafah, stating, "Without access across the borders to any supplies and without access to our distribution centres, we are simply unable to distribute food." UNOCHA stated, "There's almost nothing left to distribute in Gaza". The Independent Commission for Aid Impact stated Israel was blocking UK aid from entering Gaza. Gisha stated COGAT was dumping goods on the Israeli side of the Kerem Shalom crossing. On 23 May, UNOCHA stated, "If aid does not begin to enter Gaza in massive quantities, desperation and hunger will spread". Food waiting to enter into Rafah had rotted by late-May.

The Gaza floating pier was damaged in a storm and taken to Israel for repairs. Doctors Without Borders stated they were seeing a "further strangulation of the Gaza Strip" as fuel shortages had resulted the amount of water being distributed reduced by seven-eighths. The UN stated aid deliveries dropped 67% in May. On 29 May, World Central Kitchen announced it was pausing its operations in Rafah amidst Israeli attacks.

=== June 2024 ===
On 8 June, the United States announced deliveries would begin again following repairs made to the pier. On 10 June, the World Food Programme stated it was pausing use of the temporary pier following the Nuseirat refugee camp massacre in order to assess the security situation. The same day, the U.S. resumed airdrops. UNICEF stated that one of its humanitarian aid convoy was denied entry on 14 June to northern Gaza. On 15 June, the United States stated it was removing the pier due to inclement weather. COGAT stated 8,600 aid and commercial trucks had entered Gaza since 2 May; however, much of it was piled up at crossings because of the danger of transporting it. A UN spokesperson stated, "The lack of any police or rule of law in the area makes it very dangerous to move goods there". Humanity & Inclusion stated Israeli forces bulldozed its aid warehouse, stating they were "extremely concerned that attacks against humanitarian facilities and operations are becoming a pattern". Jeremy Konyndyk, the president of Refugees International, stated it was "almost impossible" to find warehouses in Rafah. On 25 June, senior UN officials stated they would cease humanitarian operations in Gaza if Israel did not improve safety for aid operations.

The U.S. government stated that much of the aid brought through its temporary pier was piling up on the beach, as aid groups were unable to distribute it. The UN secretary-general stated aid delivery was made more difficult by a lack of security protecting trucks, stating, "Israel does not even allow the so-called blue police to escort our convoys because it's local police linked to the local administration".

=== July 2024–December 2024 ===
The Israeli government and Starlink were reportedly in talks to set up a communications system over the Gaza Strip to improve security for UN humanitarian aid efforts. The United Nations stated that an Israeli evacuation order affecting one-third of the Strip had "wiped out" efforts to improve humanitarian aid deliveries. The UN said that they would be bringing in more personal safety equipment and armored vehicles starting 16 July following approval from Israeli officials. Humanitarian aid deliveries piled up for long stretches at a time due to distribution challenges posed to humanitarian aid organizations within Gaza. The World Food Programme stated that Israel's military actions in Gaza City had created an "unpredictable and volatile situation" and were limiting its operations there. Samantha Power, the head of USAID, stated she had received assurances from Israel that humanitarian aid workers would be allowed to work more safely. The United States permanently closed its temporary aid pier. ActionAid stated 20 of its aid trucks had been stuck in Egypt for at least two months.

A study for the period of January to July 2024 found that daily available food energy supplied to Gaza was 3004 kcal per person.

In mid-August 2024, Corinne Fleischer, the World Food Programme's Middle East regional director, stated it was "very difficult" to bring food into Gaza. Peace activists from the Freedom Flotilla Coalition stated they would attempt to break Israel's blockade on Gaza and deliver humanitarian aid. The Government of Japan committed US$2.5 million to the World Food Programme to provide emergency food assistance.

The United Nations stated it was pausing its Gaza operations in late-August 2024. A UNOCHA official stated, "Major humanitarian operations have never stopped fully, but they are at the most curtailed they have ever been due to inaccessibility." The World Food Programme similarly announced it was pausing humanitarian movements in the Gaza Strip, after an Israeli attack on a WFP team near an Israeli check point. By October 2024, private traders were responsible for 60% of aid flow into the Gaza Strip, according to Israeli military data. The same month, UNRWA reported that intensified military operations in the northern Gaza Strip were forcing them to shut down services there. James Elder, the spokesperson for UNICEF, stated, "We see now what is probably the worst restrictions we've seen on humanitarian aid, ever". By the end of October 2024, humanitarian aid to the Gaza Strip reached its lowest levels since the conflict began.

Mordechai Kahana, the Israeli-American CEO of Global Delivery Company, stated that he was in talks with the Israeli government for a $200 million plan to provide security and humanitarian aid to enclosed areas for Palestinians. According to Kahana, his message to Palestinian residents was that "you don't want to mess with us" and that "terrorists will get a bullet". In October 2024, the Israeli Knesset passed a bill banning UNRWA, which Amnesty International warned amounted to the criminalization of humanitarian aid. The head of UNRWA stated that an average of only 30 trucks entered the Gaza Strip per day in the month of October 2024.

=== 2025–present ===
In early May 2025, it was announced that the United States would proceed with a new system for providing humanitarian aid via private companies with Israeli military guarding distribution centers due to allegations of Hamas stealing aid. The aid will be distributed under the aegis of the Gaza Humanitarian Foundation. The director of the UN's office for the Coordination of Humanitarian Affairs (OCHA) Jens Laerke announced the UN's lack of participation as the system is not in line with the organizations values. Others in the UN have called the announced system a weaponization of humanitarian aid.

On August 18, a potential deal was brokered by Egypt and Qatar. Hamas agreed to release half the hostages in two batches for a 60-day ceasefire, although the Israeli government states it's only interested in the release of all hostages both living and dead in exchange for the end of the war.

On August 22, 2025, the Integrated Food Security Phase Classification, or IPC, has declared the most severe Phase 5 for some parts of Gaza including Gaza City. Between mid-August and September 30, 2025, an additional 640,000 persons are expected to face Phase 5 conditions. A statement from the Israel Prime Minister's office called this IPC declaration a "modern blood libel." The Prime Minister's statement went on to say, "Israel, will continue to act responsibly, ensuring aid reaches Gaza's civilians while destroying Hamas's terror machine."

During the war, there were some reports of women being sexually exploited by some aid workers or local men in exchange for aid, food, money or the promise of jobs. Aid organizations and experts said exploitation commonly occurs during times of conflict and desperation. Other reports of abuse and exploitation have come to light during crises such as in South Sudan and Congo.

On 4 December 2025, Xi Jinping, the leader of China, announced at a press conference that the country will provide $100 million in aid to the Palestinians to help ease the humanitarian crisis in Gaza and support reconstruction efforts.

In April 2026, the Ministry of Foreign Affairs in Afghanistan announced that 530 tonnes of humanitarian aid, valued nearly $500,000, would be delivered to Gaza.

=== Support by Country ===
Top Contributors of Aid to Gaza since October 7, 2023
Country	Type of Support	Amount ($)
China	Emergency food aid, medical supplies, and long-term reconstruction funds	100 million
Egypt	Food; medical supplies	196 million (Note: As of January 2024.)
European Union	Food; medicine; water & debris infrastructure	€550 million (Note: As of November 2025.)
Jordan	Food; medical supplies; 2 hospitals	428 million
Qatar	Food; medical supplies; 1 hospital	142 million
Saudi Arabia	Food; medical supplies	185 million
Sweden	Emergency medical care, water, sanitation, protection measures, and food	~€220 million
Turkey	Food; medical supplies	7.5 million (Note: As of August 2025, 7 million from the Disaster and Emergency Management Presidency and 0.5 million from the Turkish Red Crescent.)
United Arab Emirates	Food; medical supplies; 1 hospital	3 billion

Source: CFR

== Issues with delivery ==
On 27 October 2023, Lynn Hastings, the UN's humanitarian coordinator for Palestine, stated Israel opposed the delivery of humanitarian aid to northern Gaza. As a result, UN staff would need to risk their own lives if it was determined such aid would be "lifesaving" to people in need. Philippe Lazzarini stated "soon many more will die" from Israel's blockade.

Direct attacks on telecommunications infrastructure by Israel, electricity blockades and fuel shortages have caused the near-total collapse of Gaza's largest cell network providers. The blackouts have also impeded emergency services, making it more difficult to locate and access the time-critical injured, and have impeded humanitarian aid agencies and journalists as well. The United Nations announced a communications blackout had brought aid delivery to a "complete halt." A humanitarian zone was announced in the Khan Younis area on 29 October 2023, along with a claim that aid trucks would increase "significantly." On 30 October 2023, OCHA director Lisa Doughten pressured the UN Security Council for the use of extra entry points to Gaza, suggesting the Kerem Shalom border crossing as the only entry equipped for rapidly processing a sufficiently large number of trucks. The United Nations announced it no longer had enough fuel to deliver humanitarian aid in Gaza on 13 November 2023, leading Canadian Foreign Minister Melanie Joly to say, "This is not acceptable." The UN suspended aid delivery again on 17 November 2023 due to the shortage of fuel and the cutoff of communications.

In March 2024, following the passage of US legislation barring UNRWA funding until at least March 2025, the head of the UN organization stated, "As the backbone of the humanitarian response, any gap in funding to UNRWA will compromise access to food, shelter, primary health care & education". The UN and other aid agencies stated visa delays were part of restrictions on humanitarian aid. In May 2024, Forensic Architecture stated Israel had attacked humanitarian aid on at least 80 occasions. In June 2024, the United Nations stated the lack of safe conditions were further hindering aid operations, stating, "As the occupying power, it is incumbent upon the Israeli authorities to restore public order and safety as far as possible and facilitate safe humanitarian access".

In late-August 2024, a United Nations official reported they were pausing nearly all aid operations in Gaza. The World Food Programme also temporarily suspended movements in Gaza after coming under fire from soldiers at a nearby Israeli check point.

=== Israeli blocking of aid ===
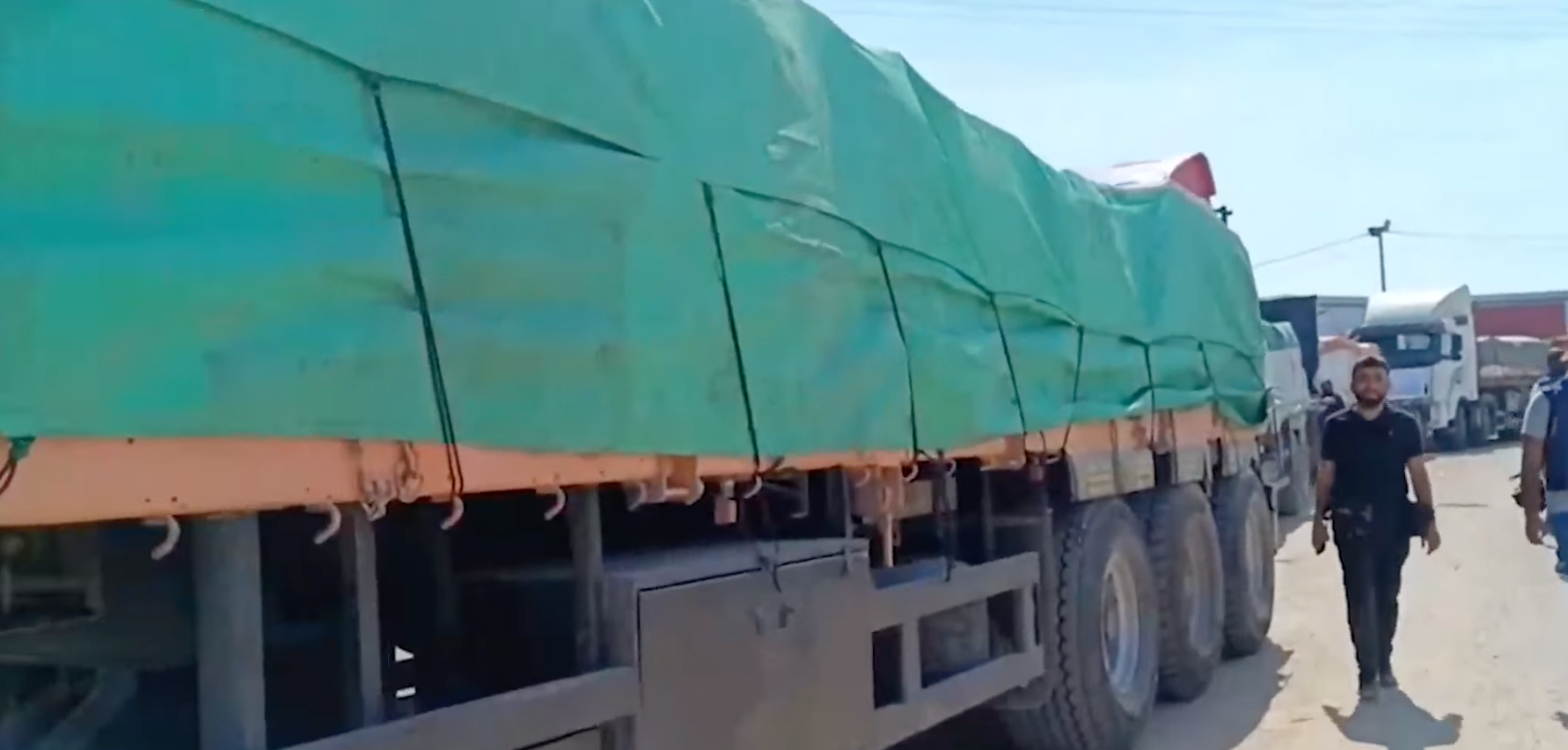
Trucks with humanitarian aid waiting to cross from Egypt into the Gaza Strip

Before being allowed entry into Gaza, humanitarian aid trucks are put through stringent inspections by Israel. Janti Soeripto, president and chief executive of Save the Children, explained to reporters the convoluted regulations that cause items to be turned back, like sanitary pads due to a nail clipper included in the hygiene kit, or sleeping bags because they had zippers. A humanitarian official in contact with the Israeli COGAT unit has raised claims that the rejections are due to the unit operating with only an obsolete list from 2008 and a lack of official guidance. Others, such as the European Union's top diplomat, Josep Borrell, have accused Israel of intentionally using starvation as a weapon of war. Israel also does not allow humanitarian aid bound for Gaza to be purchased in Israel or the West Bank, or to use Israel ports. It has also closed all but one of the Israel-Gaza checkpoints. Egyptian Foreign Minister Sameh Shoukry stated that "Israeli obstacles" were impeding the delivery of humanitarian aid. The World Health Organization stated their "requests to deliver supplies are often blocked or refused" by Israel. Antonio Guterres, the UN secretary-general, stated that alleviating conditions in Gaza "requires Israel removing the remaining obstacles and chokepoints to relief". A September 2024 investigation found that USAID and other agencies found Israel that deliberately blocked humanitarian aid, but the U.S. Secretary of State rejected their findings.

An investigation found that Israel was blocking cancer medications, sleeping bags, drinking water purification tablets, and maternity kits from entering Gaza, leading the Save the Children US president to state she had "never seen anything like the level of barriers being put in place to hamper humanitarian assistance". MP Rosena Allin-Khan stated that Israel had prevented water filters from entering Gaza. The UN reported Israel had rejected aid trucks for carrying medical scissors. On 6 March, Israel continued to block a major US shipment of flour from entering Gaza, after having already blocked it from entering for 46 days. On 7 March 2024, Israeli police blocked an aid convoy organized by the Jewish-Arab cooperation group Standing Together.

The president of the American Near East Refugee Aid stated, "Some governments—not just the US but others as well—who thought that they would make more headway with the Israelis on land aid threw up their hands and said, 'Well, let's do airdrops.'" In an interview with the New Yorker, US Senator Chris Van Hollen stated, "Administration officials have recognized that the Netanyahu government has put up unacceptable barriers to the delivery of humanitarian assistance into Gaza". Catherine Russell, the chair of UNICEF described Israel's bureaucratic approval system as Kafkaesque. In March, UNRWA said that Israel was no longer allowing the agency to deliver aid to northern Gaza. Martin Griffiths stated, "The decision to block its food convoys to the north only pushes thousands closer to famine. It must be revoked." The EU's Josep Borrell stated, "Enough food for the people starving in Gaza is stockpiled and waiting to enter through land routes".

Gisha, an Israeli human rights organization, stated Israel was blocking dual-use items and that it had petitioned the Israeli Supreme Court to order Israel to meets its obligations to civilians in Gaza. In April 2024, the Freedom Flotilla Coalition stated a scheduled aid trip to Gaza had been delayed by an administrative roadblock "initiated by Israel in an attempt to prevent our departure." A USAID internal assessment reportedly found Israel "does not currently demonstrate necessary compliance" with a requirement that countries not impede "the transport of delivery of United States humanitarian assistance". In July 2024, 13 human rights organizations, including Oxfam, Doctors Without Borders, Save the Children and the Norwegian Refugee Council, stated Israel was blocking humanitarian aid. UNICEF spokesperson James Elder stated that Israel was intentionally restricting aid from entering Gaza.

In September 2024, the Norwegian Refugee Council reported that 83% of required food aid was failing to enter the Gaza Strip. In October 2024, humanitarian aid deliveries dropped to their lowest levels in seven months, according to individuals involved with aid. After the United States told Israel it could face consequences unless it increased aid to northern Gaza, Israeli officials stated they would hold an "emergency meeting" regarding humanitarian aid. Soon after, the Israeli Knesset passed a bill barring contact between UNRWA and Israeli officials within three months, which is necessary for UNRWA to coordinate transferring aid into the Gaza Strip, due to Israel controlling all crossings. The United States responded by saying they had not seen enough progress by Israel to increase humanitarian aid deliveries. Several days later, the U.S. stated it would "follow the law" if Israel did not comply with its recommendation to allow in humanitarian aid by its deadline.

In November 2024, it was reported that Israel allowed limited delivery of aid to Beit Hanoun, in northern Gaza, but before the aid arrived, the Israeli army forced inhabitants to evacuate the area or risk being harmed in airstrikes.

In February 2025, according to the Israeli Defense Ministry, a truck carrying aid through the Erez corridor was searched and found to be smuggling hundreds of smartphones, and other electronics. The driver was subsequently arrested.

==== Suspension and ban of aid organisations ====
In December 2025, Israel announced the suspension of permits for 37 non-governmental and aid organisations, including Action Against Hunger, Médecins Sans Frontières, Mercy Corps, Norwegian Refugee Council, and Relief International from operating in Gaza for allegedly failing to meet new requirements to hand over personal details of Palestinian and international staff working in the Gaza Strip. On 1 January 2026, Israel announced the enforcement of the ban and required the organisations to cease their activities by 1 March.

In response, the United Nations High Commissioner for Human Rights Volker Türk said the suspension is "outrageous", stating that "such arbitrary suspensions make an already intolerable situation even worse for the people of Gaza" and urged Israel to reverse the decision. United Nations secretary-general António Guterres also urged Israel to reverse the ban and stated that the "suspension risks undermining the fragile progress made during the ceasefire". In Israel, 17 human rights and advocacy organisations condemned the ban, stating it "undermines principled humanitarian action, endangers staff and communities, and compromises effective aid delivery". Other countries including Canada, France, Finland, Japan, Norway, Switzerland, and the United Kingdom also issued condemnations against Israel's decision. The European Union warned that Israel's suspension of aid groups would hinder "life-saving" assistance from reaching the population of Gaza.

==== Israeli protests against aid ====
On 21 December 2023, Israeli activists attempted to block the Kerem Shalom crossing to prevent humanitarian aid from entering the Gaza Strip. On 9 January, captives' families were stopped by police trying to block humanitarian aid. On 19 January, families of captives promised "extreme actions", including blocking humanitarian aid. Hundreds protested against the entry of humanitarian aid at the Kerem Shalom crossing on 24 January 2024. Protesters again blocked aid on 25 and 26 January. On 28 January, the IDF declared the Karem Abu Salem crossing a "closed military area". Four settlers were arrested for tear-gassing and throwing rocks at aid delivery truck drivers. Protesters again blocked aid on 30 January. On 30 January, Benny Gantz and Gadi Eisenkot stated they were examining limiting humanitarian aid into Gaza. On 31 January, National Security minister Itamar Ben-Gvir called on Netanyahu to cease sending aid to Gaza.

30 were arrested protesting against aid for Gaza on 31 January. On 1 February, protests blocked aid trucks from leaving the Port of Ashdod. On 2 February, protesters blocked the Nitzana Border Crossing. On 6 February, Channel 12 reported that 132 aid trucks had been prevented from entering the Karem Abu Salem crossing. On 7 February, Israelis set up tents at the Karem Abu Salem to block aid from entering Gaza. Protesters blocked aid at the Nitzana border crossing on 9 February. Protesters blocked the Karem Abu Salem crossing on 12 February. On 14 February, an individual blocking humanitarian aid from entering Gaza stated, "We cannot give them good foods". UNOCHA reported that only 20 trucks of aid entered Gaza on 17 February. Aid was again blocked on 19 February. By 19 February, humanitarian aid entering Gaza had experienced a "clear decline" since the start of the month.

In early May 2024, Israeli settlers attacked a humanitarian aid shipment traveling to the Erez crossing, according to the Jordanian Foreign Ministry.

Then, Israeli activist group Tzav 9 claimed responsibility for the stoppage of an aid convoy at Tarqumiyah in Hebron Hills on 13 May 2024, vowing: "No aid goes through until the last of the hostages returns." Tzav 9 further provided a quote from an Israeli that stated: "Blocking the trucks is a noble and understandable act for anyone with a sound mind." Some of the aid was spilled during the stoppage by right-wing protesters, leading to police arresting four people, but after the police left, two aid trucks were set ablaze. The aid delivery workers said that the aid convoy's escort of Israeli soldiers did nothing to prevent the attack by Israeli settlers, with one aid worker stating that the convoy travelled on a "special army road that civilians could not cross", but was attacked by "at least 400 settlers", who were "throwing stones" and dumping aid, while the Israeli "army did not provide us with any kind of protection", despite being "present and watching what was happening. The army was at the service of the settlers."

BBC News reported in late May 2024: "Right-wing activists, including Jewish settlers living in the occupied West Bank, have uploaded dozens of videos of crowds, including some very young children, hurling food onto the ground and stamping on boxes of aid" meant for Gaza. Other videos, BBC News describes, "show Israeli vigilantes stopping lorries in Jerusalem and demanding that drivers show papers proving they are not transporting aid to Gaza. Their faces are uncovered and they appear to be acting with complete impunity." Peace activists, both Jews and Arab, have mobilised in an attempt to protect the aid; these peace activists have claimed that text messages exist showing aid-attacking activists asking for and gaining help from the Israeli police and the Israeli army. In June 2024, the Palestine Red Crescent Society stated Israel was blocking humanitarian aid from entering through the Rafah crossing, in violation of ICJ orders.

=== Allegations against Hamas ===
When asked about Hamas's responsibility for the safety of civilians, Hamas leader Mousa Abu Marzook allegedly replied that "it is the responsibility of the United Nations to protect them... [and] it is the responsibility of the occupation to provide them with... services". On 28 October, The New York Times reported that Hamas had stockpiled food, water, medicine and sanitary products in underground caches, in amounts that would allow it to continue fighting for several months without resupply. On 12 November, Kan 11 aired a video taken by a Gazan civilian, that appeared to show Hamas policemen beating civilians approaching a truck carrying humanitarian aid for food, before allegedly taking the supplies for themselves. According to The Algemeiner, an unnamed "Fatah TV anchor" claimed that Hamas killed humanitarian aid workers to "prevent any activity by any [other] party" and "ensure Hamas control over the aid". Israel has also claimed Hamas has stolen aid. However, US officials said they do not have evidence to support Israel's claims. On 13 September Israeli Channel 12 news played alleged intercepted recordings purporting to show Hamas operatives discussing how to disperse overflowing Gaza aid that they had seized. In the recordings of radio conversations, an operative says "We have trucks overflowing with goods." The second operative declines the offer, saying "we have everything. In the meantime, we have no room in the stores." He then suggests they send the goods to Khan Younis.

In an initiative aiming at shifting control of Gaza's population away from Hamas, U.S. aid foundation, Gaza Humanitarian Foundation outlined a $2 billion plan to establish "Humanitarian Transit Areas" in and potentially outside Gaza. These camps are described as large-scale, voluntary facilities where Palestinians could temporarily reside, undergo deradicalization, reintegrate, and prepare for potential relocation. Palestinian officials, including Hamas, have strongly rejected the proposal. A spokesperson for the Hamas-run Gaza media office dismissed GHF as a front for Israeli intelligence operating under a false humanitarian pretext.

In July 2026, UN Deputy Special Coordinator Ramiz Alakbarov issued an official UN statement, according to which UN aid distributions to Gaza were suspended after Hamas militants entered a food distribution site in Jabalia and a World Food Programme warehouse and assaulted two truck drivers. Alakbarov added that "These incidents are not isolated. They are completely unacceptable and reflect an increasingly dangerous pattern of intimidation, violence and obstruction, including smuggling attempts, targeting and abusing humanitarian operations." Hamas denied the allegations.

=== Allegations against the UN ===
In March 2024 Ynet reported that the UN was blaming Israel and feeding into the Hamas narrative, while distributing of aid is hampered by inability of organizations, and by Hamas taking over the aid.

In October 2024 COGAT officials said data presented by the UN is collected through flawed methods, leading to accusations of dishonesty and delays in aid delivery. In November 2024, the head of COGAT Major General Ghassan Alian, posted a video showing 600 trucks worth of humanitarian aid in Gaza that the UN did not distribute to Gazans.

In June 2025, the chair of the GHF Rev. Dr. Johnnie Moore, accused the UN for "playing politics with the lives of Gazans," because the UN refused to cooperate with GHF in Gaza.

In August 2025, ILTV reported from Gaza's side of the Kerem Shalom crossing that "thousands and thousands of tons of humanitarian aid [...] is sitting here in the boiling sun". Former Israeli Ambassador to the US Michael Oren said that the "UN refuse[s] to distribute it to the people of Gaza," saying that the "UN is in cahoots with Hamas".

During a diplomatic meeting in Estonia, Israeli president Isaac Herzog stated that "The UN is holding hundreds of trucks, almost 800 trucks. The UN can distribute and is failing to distribute."

== Casualties ==
=== Killing of aid workers ===
From 7 October 2023 to 23 June 2024, 193 United Nations relief workers were killed in the Gaza Strip, making it the deadliest conflict for UN workers in world history. According to Jeremy Konyndyk, the president of Refugees International, "The U.S. concern about these casualties remains almost purely rhetorical. There is no policy leverage being put behind it whatsoever. Beyond expressing concern and expressing regret, that's where it stops." By March 2024, at least 165 United Nations staff had been killed in Gaza since 7 October and more than 150 facilities attacked. The United Nations stated that 2023 was the deadliest year on record for aid workers, with Gaza representing more than half of all killed around the world.

David M. Satterfield criticized Israel killing police guarding truck convoys, stating it had made the safe distribution of aid "virtually impossible". A Norwegian Refugee Council representative stated on 20 February 2024 that Israel's targeting of aid convoys and police was "unacceptable". Following the death of one of their aid workers — the fifth American aid worker killed in Gaza — Anera released a statement: "We demand an independent investigation into his death, which threatens our team's ability to function safely and deliver aid to civilians facing starvation".

In March 2024, Israel bombed a United Nations food distribution center, killing one UN staff member and wounding 22 others. (Note: In reaction to news of the bombing, the US Secretary of State said that Israel should not bomb "clearly marked" humanitarian facilities.) It was one of the UN's last remaining distribution centers, leading UN humanitarian aid chief Martin Griffiths to state the UN's aid teams "must be protected". Stephane Dujarric, the UN Secretary-General's spokesman, stated, "It's another tragic symbol of the conditions under which our humanitarian colleagues work every day in Gaza." The next day, Israel reportedly killed 8 people in an attack on an aid warehouse in Nuseirat refugee camp. On 15 March 2024, Gaza government officials stated that 56 people had been killed in Israeli attacks on aid distribution centers in just the prior 48 hours. On 18 March 2024, the Gaza Media Office stated Israel assassinated the official in charge of coordinating aid to northern Gaza.

On 19 March 2024, at least 23 people were killed when Israeli fighter jets targeted a group of humanitarian aid coordinators at the Kuwaiti roundabout. Earlier the same day, an Israeli airstrike killed the police director in charge of facilitating humanitarian aid trucks in northern Gaza. The Gaza Media Office stated on 20 March that more than 100 aid workers had been killed in the prior seven days. The UN Secretary-General Antonio Guterres stated, "Some of them, with decades of experience, said they have never encountered a situation as difficult as this. Aid workers need resources, access and safety – now." On 29 March 2024, an Israeli attack reportedly killed a Palestinian police force that helped bring aid to northern Gaza. The UN criticized the attack, stating, "Such killings must stop. Effective aid delivery to those most in need requires civil order".

On 2 April 2024, the IDF bombed World Central Kitchen staff. The drone strikes killed seven humanitarian aid workers. According to UN Secretary-General Antonio Guterres, the strikes brought the total number of aid workers killed since 7 October to 196 people. The president of Refugees International called the killings "part of a clear pattern" and a war crime. Doctors Without Borders stated the killings were an example of how "international humanitarian law is not respected". The Polish Foreign Ministry stated, "Poland objects to the disregard for international humanitarian law". Doctors Without Borders secretary-general Christopher Lockyear stated, "This pattern of attacks is either intentional or indicative of reckless incompetence." In May 2024, the first international United Nations aid worker was killed while in a UN marked vehicle in Rafah. Human Rights Watch stated that Israel had repeatedly targeted the known locations of humanitarian aid workers.

In June 2024, UN spokesperson Stéphane Dujarric stated, "Humanitarian operations have repeatedly been in the crosshairs in Gaza. The risks, frankly, are becoming increasingly intolerable." In July 2024, the bodies of three Palestinians working to secure aid at the Kerem Shalom crossing were found, with their hands reportedly bound. The same month, an Israeli air attacked killed at least four of the Al-Khair Foundation's aid workers. An Israeli strike killed at least four Anera aid workers in late-August 2024. An Israeli strike killed a member of Mercy Corps in October 2024. In April 2025, it was reported that two workers from the Hafezzi Charitable Society of Bangladesh were killed by Israeli forces.

=== Killing of aid seekers ===
According to Forensic Architecture, a research group at Goldsmiths, University of London, more than 40 Israeli attacks on humanitarian aid seekers have been documented. According to the group, these were not isolated events, but were rather "systematic in nature".

Human Rights Watch reported eight incidents since the start of the war until May 2024 in which aid workers were attacked by Israeli forces despite providing locations for Israeli leaders. The eight incidents, it said, reveal serious flaws in the so-called "conflict prevention mechanism" – a mechanism designed to protect aid workers and allow them to safely deliver life-saving humanitarian aid to the Gaza Strip.

On 25 January 2024, the Gaza Health Ministry reported an Israeli attack on aid seekers had killed 20 and wounded 150. Israel bombed a truck loaded with food head toward northern Gaza on 5 February. On 6 February, Israeli forces reportedly open fired on people waiting for food aid trucks in Gaza City. UNOCHA stated it was the fifth report of Israeli firing upon people waiting for humanitarian aid. On 18 February, multiple instances of Israeli sniper attacks on civilians seeking humanitarian assistance were reported. On 20 February, at least one Palestinian civilian was killed while waiting to receive humanitarian aid. People seeking aid were attacked by Israeli forces on multiple occasions. UNOCHA stated on 27 February that "aid convoys have come under fire and are systematically denied access to people in need". On 28 February, medical sources in Gaza City reported three people were killed while waiting for aid on al-Rashid Street.

On 29 February, more than 100 people seeking humanitarian died in the Flour Massacre by Israeli gunfire at the Al Nabulsi roundabout west of Gaza City. The United Nations called for an investigation on 1 March into the killing of humanitarian aid seekers, stating it had "recorded at least 14 incidents involving shooting and shelling of people gathered to receive desperately needed supplies".

On 2 March, three people in Beit Hanoun were killed while picking herbs for food. On 3 March, at least nine people were killed while waiting for humanitarian aid in an Israeli airstrike in Deir el-Balah. Later on the same day, dozens of civilians were killed in an Israeli attack on aid seekers at the Kuwaiti roundabout in Gaza City. The Ministry of Health called it a "horrific massacre". On 4 March, another attack was reported at the Kuwaiti roundabout, after thousands of people waited all day for humanitarian aid, Israeli soldiers opened fire on them as soon as the trucks arrived. Al Jazeera stated the attacks on aid seekers had become "a near-daily occurrence". On 6 March, eight people were wounded after Israel fired live rounds at people seeking humanitarian aid at the Nabulsi roundabout. On 7 March, five people were killed while waiting for aid at the Nabulsi roundabout. On 8 March, several people seeking humanitarian aid were reportedly killed by Israeli open fire at the Kuwait Roundabout. By 12 March, Israel had killed an estimated 400 humanitarian aid seekers in Gaza. Israeli attacks on humanitarian aid seekers was described as the "new normal" for Palestinians in northern Gaza.

On 13 March 2024, at least nine aid seekers were shot and wounded by Israeli troops at the Kuwaiti roundabout. On 14 March 2024, Israeli troops fired on Palestinians receiving aid at the Kuwaiti roundabout, killing 21 and injuring more than 150 others. In a statement on 15 March, the UN humanitarian aid chief Martin Griffiths stated that attacks on aid seekers "cannot be allowed to continue". The Norwegian Refugee Council stated the attacks "shouldn't be happening". On 19 March, at least 23 people were killed when Israeli fighter jets targeted a group of aid coordinators at the Kuwaiti roundabout.

On 1 April 2024, an Israeli drone fired three consecutive missiles at three cars belonging to the World Central Kitchen (WCK), killing seven aid workers who had been distributing food in the northern Gaza Strip, which has been pushed close to famine by Israel's siege and blockade during the Israel–Hamas war. In June 2024, eight people were reportedly killed at an UNRWA aid distribution training center near Gaza City.

From May 2025 GHF was set up as the sole aid distributor in Gaza but repeated and regular mass shootings and killings at the distribution sites means that they have been described as "slaughter masquerading as aid".

Survivors of the repeated mass killings perpetrated at the distribution sites have called this Israeli-backed operation "traps" rather than aid. The Center for Constitutional Rights and 14 other human rights organizations have warned that the GHF could be liable for complicity in war crimes, crimes against humanity, and genocide against Palestinians.

Members of the IDF and of the Israeli police have been providing information to far right Israeli settlers about upcoming aid truck convoys delivering food to Gaza so they could intercept the deliveries to vandalize and destroy them. A spokesperson for the radical right Israeli group Tzav 9 stated that the group has been blocking aid trucks to Gaza since January 2024, acknowledged receiving advance information from Israeli forces but denied being the ones who burned trucks. Videos taken in May 2024 show Israelis intercepting aid trucks and destroying food aid. Many Israeli and Palestinian witnesses reported that the IDF soldiers sent to accompany and protect the aid trucks watched as the settlers attacked the convoys but did nothing to protect them.

On 8 March, five were killed when they were struck by airdropped aid after its parachute failed to open. A witness stated, "The parachute didn't open and fell down like a rocket on the roof of one of the houses". Stephane Dujarric called it a "tragic accident". On 9 March, a second airdrop wounded aid seekers who were taken to al-Shifa Hospital.

It was reported that on 14 March by Gaza's health ministry that at least 20 people were killed and 155 wounded by Israeli shelling when they were queued to wait for humanitarian aid to be disbursed in Kuwait Square. The IDF denied IDF forces fired upon aid seekers and that "armed Palestinians" did. On 26 March, the Gaza government media office stated that 12 people had drowned attempting to retrieve aid parcels dropped in the sea. Verified footage on 31 March showed a dead body entangled in an aid package parachute. The Government Media Office stated in May 2024 that a 14-year-old boy had been seriously injured after opening "a booby-trapped can of food".

On 1 June 2025, 32 Palestinians were killed and 200 others injured in an Israeli tank attack at a food distribution site in Rafah, located in southern Gaza. The aid was being distributed by the Gaza Humanitarian Foundation (GHF), an organization supported by Israel and the United States. The United Nations and other humanitarian organizations do not collaborate with GHF, as they believe it facilitates Israel's complete occupation of Gaza.

In September 2025, after a year-long investigation, The New Humanitarian reported that from 1 January 2024 until 9 September 2025, a total of 2,957 aid seekers were killed and nearly 20,000 others were injured by Israeli forces.

=== Killing of looters ===
In November 2024, Hamas said it killed 20 armed young men from local Bedouin tribes who were stealing aid.

== Reactions ==
=== Israeli ===
In a January 2024 press conference, Netanyahu boasted that Israel had only provided minimal aid stating; "We provide minimal humanitarian aid,...If we want to achieve our war goals, we give the minimal aid." On 23 February it was reported that over two-thirds of Jewish Israelis opposed the movement of humanitarian aid into Gaza through a survey by the Israeli Democracy Institute. The survey also offered the option of allowing humanitarian aid into Gaza via international bodies that are proven to be unlinked to Hamas or UNRWA (after Israeli allegations) and a majority of Jewish Israelis still opposed humanitarian aid.

The confusion about what humanitarian aid is being allowed into Gaza and what is being rejected, has prompted the Israeli rights group GISHA to file a Freedom of Information Act request in February 2024. The request is for the Israeli government to release details of any new restrictions on aid since the 7 October attacks. The Israeli Welfare Ministry paused visa renewals to humanitarian aid workers in February 2024, stating it couldn't investigate applicants' potential ties to armed groups.

In May 2024, five Israel human rights organizations sued the government for its restrictions on humanitarian aid, stating, "It is inconceivable that the respondents, who admit to not having even the faintest idea about the extent of the aid required for residents of the Gaza Strip, are claiming that they have fulfilled their obligations – and even beyond". Ron Dermer, the Israeli minister of strategic affairs, denied there was a famine, stating statements to the contrary were "just all false". In June 2024, Israeli national security minister Itamar Ben-Gvir stated Israel should "reduce the humanitarian aid that enters the strip".

In April 2025, Israeli Defense Minister Israel Katz expressed support for the blockade of humanitarian aid to Gaza, stating, "Israel's policy is clear: no humanitarian aid will enter Gaza, and blocking this aid is one of the main pressure levers preventing Hamas from using it as a tool with the population."

=== Palestinian ===
In response to news that the United States was building a temporary port to receive humanitarian aid on the Gaza coast, a displaced Palestinian told Al Jazeera English: "All these American weapons are killing our kids and killing us wherever we go. We don't need aid from them. We need them to stop the killing, stop the death." A director at the Gaza European Hospital stated it was more important to focus on "lifting the siege on the Gaza Strip and opening the crossings". In March 2024, Gaza officials criticized campaigns for humanitarian aid airdrops as "flashy propaganda rather than a humanitarian service".

Hamas political leader Ismail Haniyeh said that if Israel agreed to a ceasefire in the Israel–Hamas war, if humanitarian corridors would be opened, and aid would be allowed into Gaza, Hamas would be "ready for political negotiations for a two-state solution with Jerusalem as the capital of Palestine."

=== Academics ===
Mohamed Elmasry, an analyst at the Doha Institute for Graduate Studies, stated of the US beginning airdrops: "They want to be able to be able to say: We told Israel not enough aid was going in and we even did these air drops – so we weren't complicit in this genocide". Rami Khouri, a journalist and professor at the American University of Beirut, criticized the United States' plan to build a port in Gaza, stating, "I'm just waiting for the day the Israelis come and bomb the port because they've bombed everything else that the EU and other donors have funded in the occupied territories." Marc Owen Jones, a professor at Hamad Bin Khalifa University, stated that Biden's announcement of a pier in Gaza was "propaganda". Saul Takahashi, a professor at Osaka Jogakuin University, stated if the US or EU cared about Palestinians, "They would not pretend like they are Hollywood action heroes airlifting supplies into Berlin, but they would stop the endless flow of weapons to Israel".

Mohammed al-Masri, a researcher at the Palestinian Center for Research and Strategic Studies, asked, "Who will provide security to the humanitarian aid being sent to the port, and who will carry out the actual distribution? Who will manage this large relief operation?" Mohammed al-Masri, a researcher at the Arab Center for Research and Policy Studies, stated, "If the US was serious, it would have pressured Israel into opening the land crossings and allowing aid and relief in." In late-March 2024, professor Marc Owen Jones stated, "Biden is breaking, or at least not enforcing, the Leahy Laws".

=== Journalists ===
Imran Khan, an Al Jazeera English journalist, wrote about the US plan for a new port: "There is a much more efficient way of doing it as it was going on for 20 years before October 7 – the land crossings into the Gaza Strip." The editorial board of the Financial Times wrote in early-March 2024, "More than any other issue, the lack of aid illustrates the impotence of the US and its western allies... As the occupying force, it is Israel's responsibility to ensure there is sufficient food for the hungry." In May 2024, Marwan Bishara, Al Jazeera's senior political analyst, stated, "Israel is not contributing to the aid of Gaza, everything is coming from the outside world... Israel is doing nothing – zero – for the people of Gaza."

=== International ===
During a call with Netanyahu on 15 February 2024, UK prime minister Rishi Sunak "highlighted the scale of the humanitarian crisis in Gaza and urged Israel to fully open the Kerem Shalom crossing and allow the maritime delivery of international aid through Ashdod port". On 18 February, the UK Prime Minister and the European Commission President stated "significantly more aid" was needed in Gaza. On 20 February, William, Prince of Wales stated, "There is a desperate need for increased humanitarian support to Gaza. It's critical that aid gets in". During a trip by Benny Gantz to the UK, foreign minister David Cameron stated that Israel needed to change the amount of aid entering the Gaza Strip. Cameron told reporters that to avoid famine and a continued spread of diseases at least 500 trucks a day were needed in Gaza.

On 28 February 2024, a spokesman for Qatar's Ministry of Foreign Affairs stated, "We have not seen any real pressure from the international community to allow full and unconditional entry of aid. Aid should be freely provided without restrictions." King Abdullah stated that humanitarian aid to Gaza needed to be doubled. Kamala Harris stated, "People in Gaza are starving... The Israeli government must do more to significantly increase the flow of aid. No excuses". In a call, the US Secretary of Defense told the Israeli Defense Minister there was an "urgent need" to surge humanitarian aid throughout Gaza. During the 2024 State of the Union Address, the US president stated, "Humanitarian assistance cannot be a secondary consideration or a bargaining chip. Protecting and saving innocent lives has to be a priority". On 13 March, the EU and five other countries called on Israel to open more land crossings into Gaza.

The Norwegian Foreign Minister Espen Barth Eide stated, "Israel must ensure increased access of vital food supplies and aid into and within Gaza". New Zealand Minister of Foreign Affairs Winston Peters called on Israel to take "all necessary and effective steps to ensure, without delay, the unhindered provision of urgently needed basic services and humanitarian assistance." Following the killing of World Central Kitchen workers, U.S. president Joe Biden stated, "Israel has not done enough to protect aid workers". In a call with Netanyahu, Rishi Sunak stated, "Far too many aid workers and ordinary civilians have lost their lives in Gaza and the situation is increasingly intolerable". U.S. Senator Tim Kaine stated, "The amount of aid allowed by Israel to enter Gaza has been painfully slow and dramatically inadequate".

On 11 December 2023, 6 major humanitarian organizations presidents —including: CARE USA, Mercy Corps, the Norwegian Refugee Council, Oxfam America, Refugees International, and Save the Children — penned a joint op-ed in The New York Times in which it says, "We have seen nothing like the siege of Gaza". In July 2024, the Associated Press found the U.S. and Israel were allowing tax-deductible donations to Israeli far-right groups blocking humanitarian aid.

==== Freedom House ====
Freedom House issued a cautionary statement, highlighting the escalating severity of the humanitarian crisis, and urged the Israeli government to adhere to international humanitarian law.

==== EU's humanitarian aid ====
The EU's humanitarian aid chief Janez Lenarcic called on Israel to open its land crossings. In a joint statement, Lenarcic and Josep Borrell called the situation "beyond catastrophic" and called on Israel to open its land crossings in order to "secure impactful food assistance for the entire population of Gaza, the provision of specialised medical aid to address malnutrition and the implementation of public health measures". In a statement, the World Bank said, "We join the international community in calling for immediate, free, and unimpeded access of medical supplies, food and life-essential services" to Gaza."

==== Doctors Without Borders ====
According to a Doctors Without Borders video shared by Amnesty International head Agnès Callamard: "This brutal annihilation of an entire population health system stretches beyond what humanitarian aid can fix." On 4 December, Red Cross president Mirjana Spoljaric Egger visited the Gaza Strip, stating, "The things I saw there are beyond anything that anybody must be in a position in order to describe."

=== Humanitarian organizations ===
On 26 February 2024, UNRWA stated that the failure to deliver more humanitarian aid into Gaza was a "man-made disaster" caused by Israel's "security constraints and temporary closures at both crossings". Antonio Guterres stated a Rafah offensive would be the "final nail in the coffin" of its aid programmes. The spokesman for the UN High Commissioner for Human Rights, Jeremy Laurence, stated, "Border crossings must be fully opened and the necessary steps must be taken to ensure the free and safe movement of aid convoys to civilians wherever they are". In October 2024, during an interview on Amanpour & Company, the UNICEF spokesperson James Elder described the situation in Gaza as "everything that the international community ever feared, but worse somehow: no aid and more attacks on civilian areas".

Sigrid Kaag stated that Israel was not opening land border crossing due to "domestic sensitivities". James McGoldrick, a top UN official, stated aid wasn't entering Gaza because "Israel decided that politically and militarily they wanted to do it, and more important, they could do it, and they've gone ahead and done it." Tor Wennesland described the opening of the international maritime corridor as a response to "deep frustration in the international community that we can't get in sufficient supplies". Jeremy Konyndyk, the president of Refugees International, responded to international humanitarian airdrops, stating, "Facilitating airdrops – and driving media coverage around them – gives the public appearance that Israel is cooperating with humanitarian efforts. The fact that they need be considered is a major policy failure". In a report, Refugees International further found that Israel had "consistently and groundlessly" blocked humanitarian aid from entering Gaza.

The deputy director of Humanity & Inclusion stated that he was stunned by the conditions in Gaza — the worst he had ever seen in his life — stating that he had never seen such a "bombardment of an extremely densely populated and closed-off area, and a near-complete lack of access for humanitarian aid". In March 2024, Doctors Without Borders stated, "The food, water, and medical supplies so desperately needed by people in Gaza are sitting just across the border. Israel needs to facilitate rather than block the flow of supplies." A group of Israel's 12 most prominent human rights organizations stated Israel was failing to comply with the International Court of Justice's interim ruling to facilitate humanitarian aid into Gaza.

Agnès Callamard, the head of Amnesty International, stated, "Airdrops, the construction of a port are a sign of powerlessness and weakness on the part of the international community". A group of 25 humanitarian organizations issued a joint statement, saying, "States cannot hide behind airdrops and efforts to open a maritime corridor to create the illusion that they are doing enough to support the needs in Gaza. Their primary responsibility is to prevent atrocity crimes from unfolding". A Refugees International report found that the Israeli blocking of aid was creating "apocalyptic" famine-like conditions. The president of the International Rescue Committee stated airdrops were "unsafe, ineffective and dehumanizing".

In May 2024, Human Rights Watch stated Israel was in defiance of the ICJ's measure to facilitate humanitarian aid. In late-August 2024, an Israeli airstrike killed four humanitarian aid workers in the Gaza Strip, leading World Food Programme director Cindy McCain to state, "This is totally unacceptable and must change immediately. We have repeatedly asked for a functioning deconfliction system in Gaza, and yet the current arrangements have failed."

== See also ==
- Gaza Strip famine
