= Musa family airstrike =

- Part of the Gaza war and genocide
- Location within the Gaza Strip
- Location: Deir al-Balah, Gaza Strip
- Date: 18 October 2023 c. 7:30 PM
- Attack type: Airstrike
- Deaths: 30+ Palestinians
- Perpetrator: Israeli Air Force

On 18 October 2023, the Israeli Air Force carried out an airstrike which targeted the Musa family's home in Deir al-Balah in the Gaza Strip at approximately 7:30 PM. This attack was one of several that took place during the Gaza war. The Israeli strike, which hit a home sheltering numerous civilians, led to the deaths of more than 30 people from the Musa family and their in-laws (the Abu Nada family), who had sought refuge there.

== Airstrike and casualties ==
The first victim to be recovered from the rubble was 65-year-old Hiam Musa, the sister-in-law of Associated Press photojournalist Adel Hana. PBS reported that over 20 were buried under the rubble, but due to limitations of the civil defense team of Gaza, rescue workers could not retrieve their remains. A funeral was held in absentia at Shuhada Al-Aqsa Hospital.

== See also ==
- Israeli war crimes in the Gaza war
- List of massacres in the Palestinian territories
