= List of massacres in Palestine =

The following is a list of massacres that have occurred in Palestine (East Jerusalem, West Bank and the Gaza Strip) after the 1948 Palestine war.

- For massacres that took place during the 1948 Palestine War, see Killings and massacres during the 1948 Palestine War, and for related context see Nakba.
- For massacres that took place in Mandatory Palestine, see List of massacres in Mandatory Palestine.
- For massacres in Israel, see List of massacres in Israel.
- For massacres that took place prior to the British Mandate, see List of massacres in Ottoman Syria and List of massacres in Roman Judea.
- For massacres of Palestinians in Lebanon see List of massacres in Lebanon

== Massacres in Palestine ==
Name	Date	Location	Responsible Party	Deaths	Notes
Qibya massacre	14 October 1953	Qibya, Jordanian annexation of the West Bank	Israel Defense Forces	69	Qibya was the target of an Israeli raid by Unit 101 under the command of Ariel Sharon, which resulted in the deaths of some 69 unarmed Palestinian civilians.
Khan Yunis massacre	3 November 1956	Khan Yunis, Egyptian-occupied Gaza Strip	Israel Defense Forces	275+	Palestinians killed in house-to-house search for fedayeen
Rafah massacre	12 November 1956	Rafah, Egyptian-occupied Gaza Strip	Israel Defense Forces	111+	Male Palestinian villagers suspected of supporting Palestinian guerrillas
	1956 to 1982				
1983 Hebron University attack	26 July 1983	Hebron University, Hebron	Jewish Underground	3	Three Palestinian students were killed and more than thirty other people were wounded from the attack.
1990 Temple Mount killings	8 October 1990	East Jerusalem	Israeli Border Police	17	150 Palestinians wounded by Israeli security forces, and 20 Israeli civilians and police wounded by Palestinians.
Cave of the Patriarchs massacre	25 February 1994	Hebron	Israeli settler Baruch Goldstein	29	29 Muslims praying inside the Ibrahimi Mosque were killed with 125 more wounded.
Al Bureij killings	16 April 2008	Bureij	Israel Defense Forces	9	One of the victims was Palestinian journalist, Fadel Shana'a.
Ibrahim al-Maqadma Mosque missile strike	3 January 2009	Beit Lahia	Israeli Air Force	16	
2011 Itamar attack	11 March 2011	Itamar	Two Palestinians	5 (Israeli)	Both parents and three children of one family stabbed to death in their home, one infant decapitated.
Al-Dalu family killing	18 November 2012	Gaza Strip	Israel Defense Forces	12	
Battle of Shuja'iyya	19-23 July 2014	Gaza Strip	Golani Brigade	70-120	U.S. military officers alleged that the Israeli forces were not targeting Hamas sites specifically, leading to a high civilian death toll.
Wehda Street massacre	16 May 2021	Gaza Strip	Israel Defense Forces	44	Israeli forces bombed al-Wehda Street, a densely populated residential and commercial neighbourhood.
Jabalia camp massacre	31 October 2023	Jabalia Camp, Gaza Strip	Israel Defense Forces	50-120+	777+ wounded.
Shadia Abu Ghazala School massacre	13 December 2023	Gaza Strip	Israeli Ground Forces	7-15	Eyewitnesses reported the victims had been shot and killed point-blank by Israeli soldiers.
2024 Rafah hostage raid	12 February 2024	Gaza Strip	Israel Defense Forces	94-100+	Women and children, including Sidra Hassouna, killed in airstrikes on Rafah.
Flour massacre	29 February 2024	Gaza Strip	Israel Defense Forces	112+	Palestinians waiting for food aid killed after shooting by Israeli forces in Gaza.
Kuwait Roundabout mass killings	14 March 2024	Gaza Strip	Israel Defense Forces (Palestinian claim) Gazan militants (Israeli claim)	20	155 wounded.
Tel al-Sultan massacre	26 May 2024	Gaza Strip	Israel Defense Forces	40+	The Israeli Air Force struck Tel al-Sultan, Rafah, setting fire to a Palestinian displacement camp.
May 2024 Al-Mawasi refugee camp attack	28 May 2024	Gaza Strip	Israel Defense Forces	21+	Part of the Gaza War
Nuseirat refugee camp massacre	8 June 2024	Gaza Strip	Israel Defense Forces	274+	The Nuseirat rescue operation resulted in the deaths of hundreds of Palestinians in the Nuseirat refugee camp, including women and children, and over 600 injuries.
Al-Awda school massacre	9 July 2024	Gaza Strip	Israel Defense Forces	31+	Part of the Gaza War
Al-Tabaeen school attack	10 August 2024	Gaza Strip	Israel Defense Forces	80-93+	Part of the Gaza War. Al-Haq alleged that school serving as shelter was deliberately targeted by Israeli military.
14 October 2024 Al-Aqsa Hospital attack	14 October 2024	Gaza Strip	Israel Defense Forces	6+	At least 6 sheltering outside Shuhada Al-Aqsa Hospital in Deir al-Balah were killed, and 70+ injured, when an Israeli airstrike set their tents on fire. Victims include 19-year-old Sha'ban al-Dalou.
March 2025 Israeli attacks on the Gaza Strip	18 March 2025	Gaza Strip	Israel Defense Forces	855+	Israel resumed hostilities after the January 2025 ceasefire by launching airstrikes on Gaza. Sources reported the Israeli military killing hundreds.
Rafah paramedic massacre	23 March 2025	Gaza Strip	Israel Defense Forces	15	Israeli troops opened fire and killed 15 Palestinian medics.
Al-Najjar family massacre	23 May 2025	Gaza Strip	Israel Defense Forces	10	9 of the victims were children from the same family.
Fahmi al-Jarjawi School Massacre	25 May 2025	Gaza Strip	Israel Defense Forces	36	36 people were killed and 55 others were injured when Israeli forces targeted at Fahmi al-Jarjawi School.
2025 Gaza Strip aid distribution killings	27 May – 9 October 2025	Tel al-Sultan, Rafah, Netzarim, and Khan Yunis, Gaza Strip	Israel Defense Forces; Safe Reach Solutions (alleged) (Palestine) Popular Forces (alleged); Infidels Motorcycle Club (part of UG Solutions) (alleged)	2,500+	Over 2,500 Palestinians were killed as they approached the U.S.-backed Gaza Humanitarian Foundation (GHF) aid sites in Gaza.

== Other events ==
These events involving multiple deaths in Palestine are not widely known, or recognized, as 'massacres'.

Name	Date	Location	Responsible Party	Deaths	Notes
1966 attack on Samu	13 November 1966	Samu, Jordanian annexation of the West Bank	Israel Defense Forces	16	3 of those killed were civilians
13 April 1989 Nahalin raid	13 April 1989	Nahalin, West Bank	Israel Border Police	5 Palestinians	At least 30 injured
2001 Immanuel bus attack	12 December 2001	Immanuel, West Bank	Al-Aqsa Martyrs' Brigades	11 (Israeli)	Around 30 injured
Karnei Shomron Mall suicide bombing	16 February 2002	Karnei Shomron, West Bank	Popular Front for the Liberation of Palestine	3 (Israeli)	27 injured
Atzmona attack	7 March 2002	Atzmona settlement, Gaza Strip	Hamas	5 (Israeli)	Attack on an Israeli pre-military academy in the occupied Gaza Strip killed 5 students and injured 23.
Battle of Jenin	1-11 April 2002	Jenin Camp	Israel Defense Forces	52	Human Rights Watch alleged that the casualties included 22 civilians.
2002 French Hill suicide bombing	19 June 2002	East Jerusalem	Al-Aqsa Martyrs' Brigades claimed responsibility	7 (Israeli) (+1 suicide bomber)	
2002 Itamar attack	20 June 2002	Itamar, West Bank	Popular Front for the Liberation of Palestine	5 (Israeli)	Victims included 3 children; 10 injured
2002 Immanuel bus Attack	14 July 2002	Immanuel, West Bank	DFLP and Fatah	9 (Israeli)	20 injured
2002 Gaza Bombing	22 July 2002	Gaza City	Israel Defense Forces	17	Airstrike targeting Salah Shehade killed him and 15 civilians, including 11 children. 150 civilians were injured.
Hebrew University bombing	31 July 2002	East Jerusalem	Hamas	9 (Israeli and American)	Victims included 5 U.S. students, and injured about 100
Shmuel HaNavi bus bombing	19 August 2003	East Jerusalem	Hamas	20+ (Israeli)	
Murder of the Hatuel family	2 May 2004	Gush Katif, Gaza Strip	Hamas	5 (Israeli)	
2005 Shilo shooting	17 August 2005	Shiloh	Israeli settler	4	Fatalities were four male Palestinian laborers.
Kedumim bombing	30 March 2006	Kedumim, West Bank	Al-Aqsa Martyrs' Brigades	4 (Israeli)	
2006 Gaza beach explosion	9 June 2006	Gaza Strip	Israel Defense Forces (Human Rights Watch claim) Land mine or unexploded artillery shell (Israeli claim)	8	At least 30 others were injured.
2006 shelling of Beit Hanoun	8 November 2006	Beit Hanoun	Israel Defense Forces	19+	12 victims were children; at least 40 injured
Al-Fakhura school shelling	6 January 2009	Jabalia Camp	Israel Defense Forces	12-43	
2014 Gaza war beach bombings	9-16 July 2014	Gaza Strip	Israel Defense Forces	13	
Duma arson attack	31 July 2015	Duma	Israeli settlers	3	
2015 Jerusalem bus attack	13 October 2015	East Talpiot settlement, East Jerusalem	Two Palestinians	3 (Israeli)	
2015 Gush Etzion Junction shooting	19 November 2015	Gush Etzion settlement	Lone Palestinian	3 (2 Israeli, 1 Palestinian)	
2017 Halamish stabbing attack	21 July 2017	Halamish settlement, West Bank	Lone Palestinian	3 (Israeli)	
Al-Sawarki family bombing	14 November 2019	Gaza Strip	Israel Defense Forces	8	Included 3 children from the same family
January 2023 Jenin Incursion	26 January 2023	Jenin Camp	Israel Defense Forces and Israel Border Police	9	19 injured.
2023 Neve Yaakov shooting	27 January 2023	Neve Yaakov settlement, East Jerusalem	Lone Palestinian	7 (Israeli)	
February 2023 Nablus incursion	22 February 2023	Nablus	Israel Defense Forces	11	Separate investigations by the New York Times and the Washington Post showed Israeli forces targeting and shooting at civilians.
2023 Hamra junction shooting	7 April 2023	Hamra settlement, West Bank	Hamas	3 (Israeli)	The victim were three Israeli settlers with British citizenship from the same family.
June 2023 Jenin incursion	19 June 2023	Jenin Camp	Israel Defense Forces and Israel Border Police	5	90+ wounded.
July 2023 Jenin incursion	3 July 2023	Jenin Camp	Israel Defense Forces	12-18	
Killing of Awni El-Dous	7 October 2023	Gaza Strip	Israel Defense Forces	15	
Hajji Tower airstrike	10 October 2023	Gaza Strip	Israel Defense Forces	3+	3 journalists covering the evacuation of a nearby building were killed.
Al-Ahli Arab Hospital explosion	17 October 2023	Gaza City	Israel Defense Forces (Palestinian and human rights orgs claim) Misfired PIJ rocket (Israel and U.S. claim)	100–300 (United States) ~250 (Al-Shifa Hospital) 471 (Gaza Health Ministry)	
Musa family airstrike	18 October 2023	Gaza Strip	Israel Defense Forces	30+	
Church of Saint Porphyrius airstrike	19 October 2023	Gaza Strip	Israel Defense Forces	18	
Engineer's Building airstrike	31 October 2023	Gaza Strip	Israel Defense Forces	106+	Human Rights Watch said there was no evidence of any military targets in the area at the time of the attack, making the strike an apparent war crime.
Osama bin Zaid School airstrike	3 November 2023	Gaza Strip	Israel Defense Forces	20+	
Al-Fakhoora school airstrikes	4 November 2023	Jabalia refugee camp, northern Gaza Strip	Israel Defense Forces	65+	Bombed facility was an UNRWA school in partnership with the Education Above All Foundation.
Killing of Hammam Allouh	12 November 2023	Gaza Strip	Israel Defense Forces	4	
Al-Falah School airstrike	17 November 2023	Gaza Strip	Israel Defense Forces	20+	
Shehada family strike	14 December 2023	Rafah	Israel Defense Forces	30	
Haifa School airstrike	15 December 2023	Khan Yunis	Israel Defense Forces	20+	Resulted in the death of Al Jazeera photographer Samer Abu Daqqa and the injury of Wael Al-Dahdouh, director of Al Jazeera in Gaza.
Killing of Alon Shamriz, Yotam Haim, and Samer Talalka	15 December 2023	Gaza Strip	Israel Defense Forces	3	In Israeli friendly fire incident, three civilian Israeli hostages were shot dead as they approached a group of IDF soldiers.
Salem family airstrikes (December 19, 2023)	19 December 2023	Rimal, Gaza City	Israel Defense Forces	270	
2023 Zorob family airstrike	19 December 2023	Rafah	Israel Defense Forces	25	
Nasser Hospital siege	21 January – 28 February 2024	Khan Yunis	Israel Defense Forces	210+	
Killing of Hind Rajab	29 January 2024	Gaza Strip	Israeli Ground Forces	9	Five year old Hind called Palestine Red Crescent Society asking for help. Recording of her call shared widely. She was killed along with her family and two medical professionals sent to rescue her.
World Central Kitchen aid convoy attack	1 April 2024	Gaza Strip	Israel Defense Forces	7	
Al-Sardi school attack	6 June 2024	Gaza Strip	Israel Defense Forces	33+	
June 2024 Al-Mawasi refugee camp attack	21 June 2024	Gaza Strip	Israel Defense Forces	25	
June 2024 northern Gaza City airstrikes	22 June 2024	Al-Shati refugee camp and Tuffah, Gaza	Israel Defense Forces	43+	
Killing of Ihab al-Ghussein	6 July 2024	Gaza City, Gaza Strip	Israel Defense Forces	4	
22 July 2024 Khan Yunis attack	22 July 2024	Gaza Strip	Israel Defense Forces and Israeli Air Force	73+	Palestinians fled Khan Yunis as Israelis tanks advanced into the area. Tank shelling and aerial bombardment killed at least 73.
Khadija School airstrike	26 July 2024	Gaza Strip	Israel Defense Forces	30+	
Hamama School bombing	4 August 2024	Gaza Strip	Israel Defense Forces	30+	
August 2024 Deir al-Balah attacks	17 August 2024	Deir al-Balah, Gaza Strip	Israel Defense Forces	34+	
September 2024 Al-Mawasi refugee camp attack	10 September 2024	Gaza Strip	Israel Defense Forces	19-40	
September 2024 Al-Jawni School attack	11 September 2024	Gaza Strip	Israel Defense Forces	18+	Two Israeli airstrikes on the UN-run school in Nuseirat refugee camp killed at least 18 people, including 6 UNRWA staff.
Killing of Wafa Al-Udaini	29 September 2024	Gaza Strip	Israel Defense Forces	4	
2024 Tulkarm Camp airstrike	3 October 2024	Tulkarm	Israel Defense Forces and Shin Bet	18+	First Israeli airstrike in the area since 2002.
October 2024 Deir al-Balah mosque bombing	6 October 2024	Deir al-Balah, Gaza Strip	Israel Defense Forces	26+	
October 2024 Rufaida school attack	10 October 2024	Gaza Strip	Israel Defense Forces	28+	
October 2024 Abu Hussein school attack	17 October 2024	Gaza Strip	Israel Defense Forces	28+	
29 October 2024 Beit Lahia airstrike	29 October 2024	Beit Lahia	Israel Defense Forces	55-93+	An Israel Defense Forces airstrike on a residential building in Beit Lahia killed at least 55 to 93 Palestinians, including 25 children.
19 October 2024 Beit Lahia attacks	19 October 2024	Beit Lahia	Israel Defense Forces	92+	
4 December 2024 al-Mawasi attack	4 December 2024	Gaza Strip	Israeli Air Force	20+	
April 2025 Shuja'iyya airstrike	9 April 2025	Gaza Strip	Israel Defense Forces	35+	
Killing of Fatima Hassouna	16 April 2025	Gaza City, Gaza Strip	Israel Defense Forces	11	Photographer and journalist Fatima Hassouna was killed by an Israeli airstrike alongside 10 other members of her family.
2025 Wehda Street airstrikes	7 May 2025	Rimal, Gaza Strip	Israel Defense Forces	33+	
Al-Baqa Cafe airstrike	30 June 2025	Gaza City, Gaza Strip	Israel Defense Forces	41+	Casualties included journalist Ismail Abu Hatab.
2025 Nasser Hospital strikes	25 August 2025	Nasser Hospital, Khan Yunis, Gaza Strip	Israel Defense Forces	22	At least 22 people, including five journalists were killed in a double tap strike at Nasser Hospital by Israeli forces.
Assassination of Abu Obaida	30 August 2025	Rimal, Gaza City, Gaza Strip	Israel Defense Forces	11	Abu Obaida, the spokesman of Hamas, was killed by an Israeli airstrike, along with several other people, including children.
Al-Farabi School Bombing	7 September 2025	Al-Farabi School, Gaza City, Gaza Strip	Israel Defense Forces	8	
2025 Ramot Junction shooting	8 September 2025	Ramot Junction, East Jerusalem	Hamas (claimed responsibility)	8 (6 Israeli, 2 perpetrators)	
Bani Odeh family shooting	15 March 2026	Tammun, West Bank	Israel Defense Forces	4	Two other members of the family were also injured by the IDF.

== See also ==
- 12 February 2024 Rafah strikes
- Gaza Strip mass graves
- Israeli bombing of the Gaza Strip
- Israeli war crimes
- List of massacres in Israel
- War crimes in the Gaza war
- Zeitoun killings
- Majdal Shams attack
- Ras Sedr massacre
- USS Liberty incident
