= Flour Massacre =

2024 mass killing by Israeli forces

- Part of the Gaza war and Israeli war crimes in the Gaza war
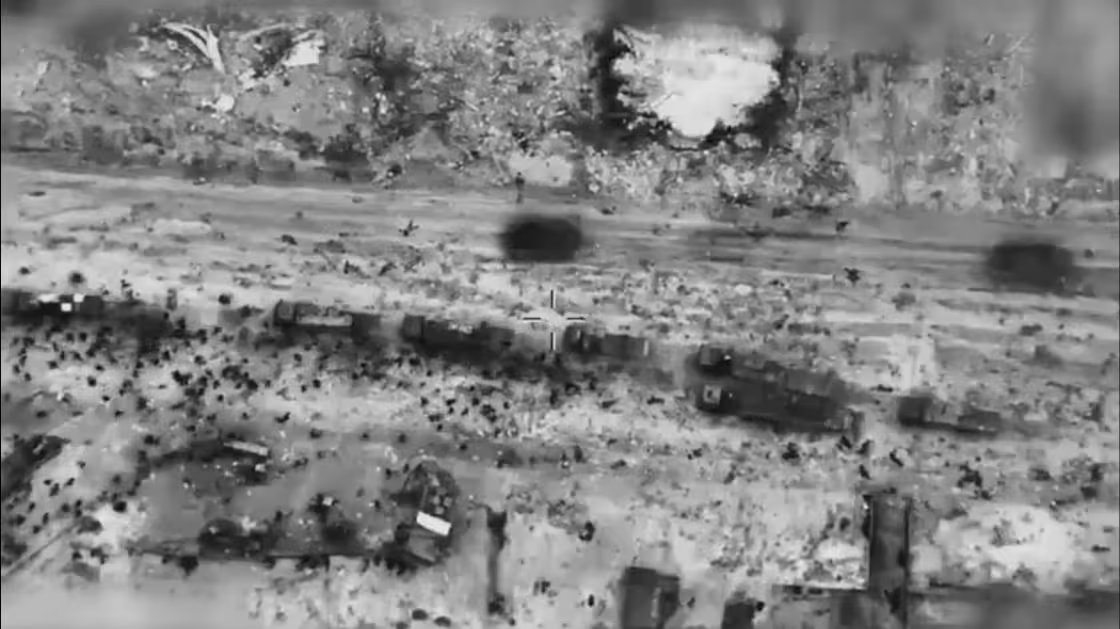
- An aerial view of the massacre captured by an Israeli drone. Aid trucks and Palestinian pedestrians (some dead) are visible.

- Location within the Gaza Strip
- Native name: مجزرة الطحين (Arabic)
- Location: 31°30′9.95″N 34°24′52.34″E; Netzarim Corridor, Palestine
- Date: 29 February 2024 (UTC+02:00)
- Attack type: Massacre, mass shooting
- Deaths: 118+ Palestinian civilians
- Injuries: 760+ Palestinian civilians
- Perpetrator: Israel Defense Forces

The Flour Massacre (Arabic: مجزرة الطحين, romanized: majzarat aṭ-ṭaḥīn) occurred in the Gaza Strip on 29 February 2024, when at least 118 Palestinians were killed and 760 injured after Israeli forces opened fire while the Palestinians were seeking food from aid trucks on the coastal al-Rashid Street in Gaza City.

The name Flour Massacre arises from the fact that many victims were found soaked in both flour and blood, symbolizing the humanitarian crisis and the deadly consequences of seeking basic sustenance in a conflict zone. The incident was the deadliest mass casualty event to have taken place in the Gaza Strip since the start of Israel's invasion, and took place a day after the World Food Programme (WFP) reported that more than half a million Palestinians were at risk of famine in Gaza.

An aid convoy entered the northern Gaza Strip on the morning of the incident, with the trucks provided by Palestinian businessmen, and security and organization by Israel. Israel says that its forces felt endangered from the crowds of Palestinians, firing warning shots in the air and then opened fire killing less than ten people, and that the rest were killed in an ensuing stampede. Survivors described the massacre as an ambush, stating that Israeli forces deliberately opened fire as Palestinians approached the aid trucks, resulting in a rush away from the gunfire that added to the death toll.

A CNN investigation reported that Israel's claims that the incident had begun after 4:30 a.m. local time cast doubt on its version of events, as it had collected and analyzed footage from survivors, including one video showing that gunfire started seven minutes prior. It also reported that the Israeli military's publicized drone footage misses the moment capturing what caused the crowds to disperse, and that Israel had rejected its requests for the full unedited footage.

Officials from three hospitals respectively reported treating over 100, 142, and "dozens" of people with gunshot wounds, with a "large number of gunshot wounds" confirmed at al-Shifa Hospital by the United Nations (UN). The Gaza Health Ministry (GHM) dubbed the incident a massacre where 118 people were killed. Tareq Abu Azzoum, a correspondent for Al Jazeera, suggested the attack was part of a broader pattern of Israeli attacks on people seeking humanitarian aid.

== Background ==
Since Hamas was elected in 2007, Gaza has been under an Israeli blockade which has restricted the flow of goods and movement in and out of the Gaza Strip. On 7 October 2023, militants from Hamas broke into Israeli territory, killing over 1,200 Israelis, civilians and soldiers, with another 251 taken hostage. In response, Israel implemented a tightened complete blockade on Gaza, preventing the entry of any humanitarian aid on 9 October. By 18 October, Israel announced it would allow food, water, and medicine to be delivered to a "safe zone" in west Khan Yunis in southern Gaza, distributed by the United Nations (UN). Continued issues were seen with the delivery of aid into Gaza, with fluctuating numbers of trucks and aid parcels, destruction of convoy vehicles by the Israel Defense Forces (IDF), Israeli civilians and officials blocking aid in protests, and IDF statements that Hamas leadership was stockpiling and controlling the aid's distribution. (Note: After the IDF stated Hamas was stealing humanitarian aid, David M. Satterfield, a senior U.S. envoy, stated there was no evidence to support Israel's claims.) On 27 January, the International Court of Justice issued preliminary measures ordering Israel to "enable the provision of urgently needed basic services and humanitarian assistance" to Gaza. In late February, Amnesty International and Human Rights Watch (HRW) stated Israel was failing to comply with this order.

Concerns about the sparse amount of aid being allowed into Gaza and the chaos it could generate was highlighted by Jan Egeland of the Norwegian Refugee Council (NRC) who described an aid delivery being looted by desperate civilians due to the low amount of aid. Israel also faced criticism for creating "lawlessness" after killing the Gazan police responsible for safeguarding humanitarian aid. The New York Times reported "spiraling lawlessness" and desperation in the area after Israel's invasion of the Gaza Strip. Axios reported that armed gangs have been attacking and looting aid trucks since Hamas police have quit due to Israeli attacks.

On 18 February, the World Food Programme (WFP) attempted to continue deliveries to the north, but desperate people in southern Gaza took most of the food. According to the United Nations in a report on 27 February more than half a million people in Gaza are on the brink of famine, with the UN World Food Programme warning of a real prospect of famine by May 2024. International aid groups have reported people in northern Gaza are already facing near famine levels of hunger. The Gaza Health Ministry (GHM) has reported that northern Gaza is already in famine. Medical officials have reported a "significant number" of children have died due to malnutrition, and Palestinians in Gaza City have been eating grass and animal feed to survive. During February 2024, only 2,300 aid trucks entered the Gaza Strip, averaging 82 per day, about half the number that entered in January and far below the 500 trucks per day before the war began. A spokesperson for the Palestine Red Crescent Society (PRCS) stated: "The lack of civil order contributed to around a 50 percent decrease in the total number of aid trucks entering Gaza in February". An Egyptian aid truck driver described people climbing and smashing aid trucks to take supplies, adding that there is a risk for drivers "because they are not secured at all".

Prior to the attack, there were multiple reports of Israeli attacks on humanitarian aid convoys and aid seekers. On 25 January 2024, the Gaza Health Ministry (GHM) reported an Israeli attack on aid seekers had killed 20 and wounded 150. On 5 February, Israel bombed a truck loaded with food headed toward northern Gaza. On 6 February, Israeli forces opened fire on people waiting for food aid trucks in Gaza City. The UN Office for the Coordination of Humanitarian Affairs (OCHA) stated it was the fifth report of Israel firing upon people waiting for humanitarian aid. On 20 February, at least one Palestinian civilian was killed while waiting to receive humanitarian aid. An Al Jazeera report on 27 February had found people seeking aid had faced "consistent" attacks by Israeli forces. The day before the attack, medical sources in Gaza City had reported that three people were killed while waiting for aid on al-Rashid Street.

The Israeli Coordinator of Government Activities in the Territories (COGAT) stated that the first convoys carrying food to northern Gaza in a month had started that week, and that 31 trucks carrying food had entered northern Gaza the previous day. The UN was not involved in organising these convoys. Hani Mahmoud, a journalist in Gaza, said of the trucks that had reached northern Gaza: "Compared with the needs of the 600,000 people there, that is nothing".

After the incident, the IDF spokesperson stated that they had been delivering aid without problem for four days leading up to the incident, and that Israel has not put any limit on the amount of aid that can be delivered into Gaza. Humanitarian aid workers, however, described this characterization as "disingenuous". Israel has stated that the UN is to blame for the lack of delivery of humanitarian aid. The UN OCHA has rebuked those statements. The aid delivery was operated by private contractors as part of an Israeli operation which OCHA said was made without coordination with the UN. The aid convoy was one of at least four convoys organized by Israel in a new collaboration with local Palestinian businessmen to northern Gaza, where international groups have paused the majority of operations, citing Israeli refusals to give clearance to aid trucks and increasing lawlessness. The trucks were provided by local businessmen, with security and organization done by Israel.

== Event ==
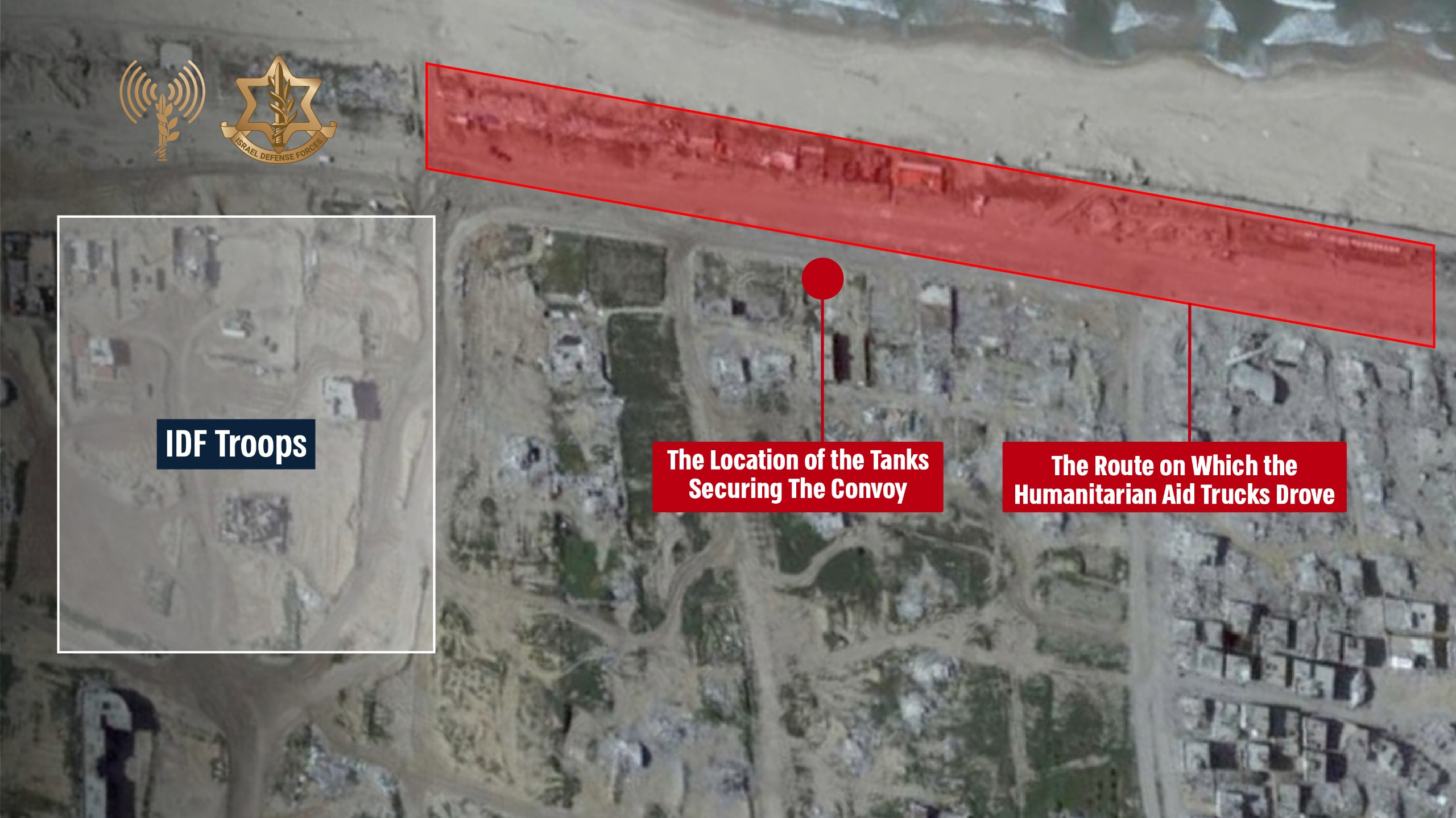
Image provided by IDF spokesperson Rear Admiral Daniel Hagari showing route of aid trucks and location of IDF troops

Per an IDF spokesperson at approximately 4:45 am, eighteen to thirty humanitarian aid trucks that had been sent from surrounding countries arrived in northern Gaza after passing through the Kerem Shalom checkpoint on the southern Gaza border with Israel. The Associated Press (AP) reported that it was not clear who had organized the delivery of aid. A representative from Ummah Welfare Trust (UWT) told Sky News their partners on the ground had liaised with the Israelis for the delivery. The BBC reported that IDF tanks had escorted the trucks to the delivery location. The trucks began to travel through a humanitarian corridor that the IDF had secured. A large group of Palestinians rushed toward the aid trucks. Per a local journalist who witnessed the incident, the large crowds had gathered to wait for the aid and food to be disbursed from the trucks.

Reports based on witness accounts describe shooting beginning at 4:30 a.m. and continuing over the next hour and a half. According to an IDF spokesperson, due to the chaos IDF troops and tanks stationed along and near the aid convoy fired warning shots in an attempt to disperse the crowd surrounding the aid trucks. The IDF then stated that after the convoy was able to clear the area, some of those that had rushed the convoy began to approach the IDF forces and tanks. In response, the IDF opened fire. Video of the crowd broadcast by Al Jazeera records the sound of gunfire and shows tracer ammunition over the crowd from the Israeli military position. Citing witnesses, CNN reported that civilians "swarmed" the aid trucks while: "Israeli forces soon started shooting [...] The aid trucks tried to escape the area, accidentally ramming others and causing further deaths and injuries". Witnesses stated the "stampede" began only after the Israeli forces opened fire on the people seeking food. Al Jazeera reported on 5 March, "Accounts from the thousands of Palestinians who were there are clearer: Israeli forces fired indiscriminately into the crowd which killed dozens of people and led to a stampede in which more people died".

Gazan doctor Yehia Al Masri, who was near the scene of the incident, said he heard shelling and gunshots at around 4 am, and went outside to an intersection when the shooting subsided. He described seeing dozens of dead and injured people lying on the street with gunshot wounds to the head, neck, and groin, who were soaked in flour and blood. Journalist Mahmoud Awadeyah, who witnessed the incident, said there were many: "people looking for something to eat [...] Israelis purposefully fired at the men [...] they were trying to get near the trucks that had the flour [...] They were fired at directly and prevented people to come near those killed". Al Jazeera journalist Ismail al-Ghoul reported that: "Israeli tanks advanced and ran over many of the dead and injured bodies". Local journalist Khadeer Al Za'anoun, who witnessed the incident, said that chaos and confusion only began once Israeli forces opened fire, which led to people being hit by aid trucks. According to Al Za’anoun: "Most of the people that were killed were rammed by the aid trucks during the chaos and while trying to escape the Israeli gunfire". One aid truck was used to carry the wounded to al-Shifa Hospital.

One injured survivor, Kamel Abu Nahel, said that Israeli soldiers opened fire on the crowd as people were taking food out of trucks, causing them to scatter. Another survivor stated people in front of him were shot by Israeli snipers who "targeted their heads, elbows and knees". Other survivors described the attack as an ambush, stating they were shot by attack drones, naval forces, and armoured vehicles. One survivor stated, "Once we approached the aid trucks, the Israeli tanks and warplanes started firing at us as if it was a trap". Multiple survivors described being directly targeted by Israeli fire. After the shooting stopped, the people returned to the trucks and the soldiers opened fire again.

== Victims ==
Initial reports of the incident said that 50 people were killed. The Palestinian Foreign Ministry confirmed the incident and said that 70 people died and at least 250 were wounded. The Palestinian Ministry of Health in Gaza later revised the death toll to least 112, with about 760 people injured. Palestinian ambassador to the United Nations Riyad Mansour later told reporters that the death toll rose to 122, but his statement was unable to be verified.

Kamal Adwan Hospital in Gaza City reported receiving approximately 100 people injured with gunshot wounds and the bodies of 12 people who had been killed. Journalist Hossam Shabat reported that every casualty he saw at that hospital had suffered bullet wounds, "including to the chest, jaw and shoulder." The director of Kamal Adwan stated: "We are operating on batteries [...] we have no operating rooms. I stand helpless. We are simply administering first-aid treatment only". The head of nursing at al-Shifa Hospital, Jadallah al-Shafei, described how:

"The hospital was flooded with dozens of dead bodies and hundreds of injured. The majority of the victims suffered gunshots and shrapnel in the head and upper parts of their bodies. They were hit by direct artillery shelling, drone missiles and gun firing."

At al-Awda Hospital, director Dr. Mohammed Salha told reporters that 142 of the 176 wounded brought to the hospital had gunshot wounds, and that the remaining 34 were injured from a stampede. Stephane Dujarric, the spokesperson for the United Nations Secretary-General, stated that among the injured patients: "there were a large number of gunshot wounds". Similar comments were made by Giorgios Petropoulos, leader of the Gaza unit of the United Nations Office for the Coordination of Humanitarian Affairs (OCHA), who visited al-Shifa Hospital; Petropoulos also spoke of a patient telling him that Israeli forces "shot into the thickest part of the crowd".

The spokesperson of the Gaza Health Ministry (GHM) said that the death toll was expected to rise as dozens of the wounded were reported to be in critical or serious condition. The injuries of patients taken to al-Shifa Hospital varied, ranging from gunshot wounds to being trampled to being struck by artillery shells from tanks. The head of ambulance services at al-Shifa stated the hospital was overwhelmed by the large of wounded. At least 160 of the wounded were taken to Al-Awda Hospital, where patients were treated for gunshot wounds and tank shell injuries. A doctor at the hospital told The Independent that 27 of the patients needed urgent surgery, but fuel shortages caused difficulty in conducting them. The Palestinian Red Crescent Society (PRCS) stated that many of the wounded would not receive treatment due to the healthcare system collapse.

== Investigations ==
=== International ===
On the same day as the attack, Amnesty International announced it was launching an investigation, stating it: "is investigating this as part of its ongoing documentation of violations against Palestinian civilians". Several days after the attack, a senior crisis response adviser at Amnesty stated, "There is concrete evidence that contradicts whatever statements are being made by the Israeli authorities".

French Foreign Minister Stéphane Séjourné stated: "We will demand explanations and there will need to be an independent investigation". The United States blocked an attempt at the UN to condemn Israeli actions. The European External Action Service (EEAS) stated that many of the dead and wounded were "hit by Israeli army fire" and called for an independent investigation. The office of EU foreign policy chief Josep Borrell called for an: "impartial international investigation on this tragic event". UN Secretary-General António Guterres suggested that an independent investigation was needed.

An investigation by the Euro-Med Human Rights Monitor found that many bullets from: "a sample of 200 dead and injured" as well at the massacre site were 5.56×45mm NATO bullets, which are used in assault rifles and machine guns by the Israeli military.

=== Israeli Defense Forces ===
Aerial footage released by the Israel Defense Forces (IDF). The longer video consists of four smaller sections spliced together rather than a consecutive sequence; The New York Times described the footage as: "a heavily edited video [released] to deflect blame". The IDF has refused to make unedited footage available. One part of the video was identified by NBC News as showing bodies.

The Israel Defense Forces (IDF) said fewer than ten of the casualties directly resulted from Israeli fire. The IDF attributed many casualties to chaos and stampedes triggered by the arrival of aid trucks in northern Gaza, leading to numerous injuries. An IDF spokesman said that the army did not fire at the crowd at the head of the main aid convoy, but fired at the tail of the convoy hundreds of yards south. The spokesman described them as rushing towards trucks and then approaching Israeli troops and a tank securing the road. IDF spokesman Peter Lerner stated:

"The tanks that were there to secure the convoy see the Gazans being trampled and cautiously tries to disperse the mob with a few warning shots."

The IDF spokesman stated that an officer in the area ordered soldiers to fire warning shots into the air and at the legs of those who continued to advance towards the checkpoint. When asked about what constituted a threat to Israeli soldiers, Lerner said that anyone who approaches despite a warning is classified as a threat. A drone video published by the IDF showed thousands of people swarming aid trucks, surrounding them as they arrived at al-Rashid. The IDF stated that some people were looting equipment. Trucks were seen attempting to push through the crowds. The IDF attributed most of the casualties to stampeding and being run over by the aid trucks. The videos also showed people climbing on top of trucks. The New York Times reported that:

"The video, which does not include audio, was edited by the Israeli military with multiple clips spliced together, leaving out a key moment before many in the crowd start running away from the trucks, with some people crawling behind walls, appearing to take cover."

Following a break, the video shows "at least a dozen bodies are visible on the ground at the scene", which includes aid trucks and two Israeli military vehicles. The New York Times reported that "Israeli officials declined to provide unedited footage".

The BBC reported that the IDF's video "is not one single sequence", but was edited into four sections, the first two sections showing people surrounding lorries just south of the Nabulsi roundabout and the second two further south which show motionless figures lying on the ground, with "what appear to be Israeli military vehicles nearby." Additionally, CNN reported that multiple eyewitness accounts also contradict the IDF's timeline on the events, with witnesses saying that the IDF had begun firing automatic weapons before the convey has even crossed through the checkpoint.

Scholars Lee Douglas (Goldsmiths, University of London) and Ali Feser (Clarkson University) noted the dehumanizing effect of the images released, stating that the aerial footage:

"Depicts Gazans through the crosshairs of a drone camera. They appear not as people, but as small gray specks, entities that seem to 'swarm' around the aid-dispensing trucks. Distance and lack of detail make the imagery even more horrific; it seems to deliberately dehumanize Gazans, to show them as 'pests,' outside of the category of the human, and thereby exempt from international law."

=== Palestinian human rights organizations ===
Three organizations, the Palestinian Centre for Human Rights (PCHR), Al Mezan, and Al-Haq, issued a joint statement condemning the massacre. Summarizing their conclusions based on interviews, video records, and contacting medical staff, they stated:

"According to initial information obtained by our field researchers, on 29 February 2024, at approximately 4:30 a.m., Israeli tanks and snipers stationed southwest of Gaza city opened heavy fire on thousands of Palestinian civilians who were desperately waiting for hours for aid convoys to arrive. The intense shooting by the IOF, which continued for approximately an hour and a half, coincided with the arrival of aid trucks near Al-Nabulsi roundabout on Al-Rashid Street, after they entered through an Israeli checkpoint. Dozens of people boarded the trucks to take flour bags and packages of canned food. The continued shooting subsequently caused more injuries and hampered the prompt arrival of ambulance and rescue teams, impeding the transfer and adequate treatment of the victims."

=== CNN investigation ===
CNN called the massacre the deadliest mass casualty event to have taken place in the Gaza Strip following Israel's operation, that cast doubt on Israel's version of events. Their investigation collected dozens of testimonies and videos from several eyewitnesses, including some who had travelled from other parts of Gaza in order to bring their families something to eat. When the aid convoy passed through an Israeli checkpoint, survivors said that Israeli forces began opening fire on the crowds that had gathered to reach the aid. Multiple people said that if they did not die from the bullets, they would have died of hunger instead.

Israel said that the aid convoy started crossing into the northern part of the Gaza Strip escorted by its tanks at 4:29 a.m., and that a minute later, Israeli troops fired "warning shots" toward the direction of the east to disperse crowds and later fired at what it described as "suspects" who it was claimed posed a threat. The Israeli military said that it fired more warning shots at 4:45 a.m. However evidence, collected by CNN and reviewed by forensic experts, indicated that automatic gunfire began seven minutes before 4:29 a.m., and that shots were fired within close range of the crowds. CNN said that the Israeli military's night-vision drone footage that was published shows a clear view of the crowds, but misses the moment capturing what caused the crowds to disperse. Israel had rejected CNN's requests for the full unedited footage.

The head of the UN humanitarian coordination sub-office in the Gaza Strip Georgios Petropoulos estimated that he had seen at least 200 people being treated for injuries, including gunshot wounds. Videos and photos published in the aftermath showed aid food boxes strewn on the ground and splattered with blood.

== Reactions ==
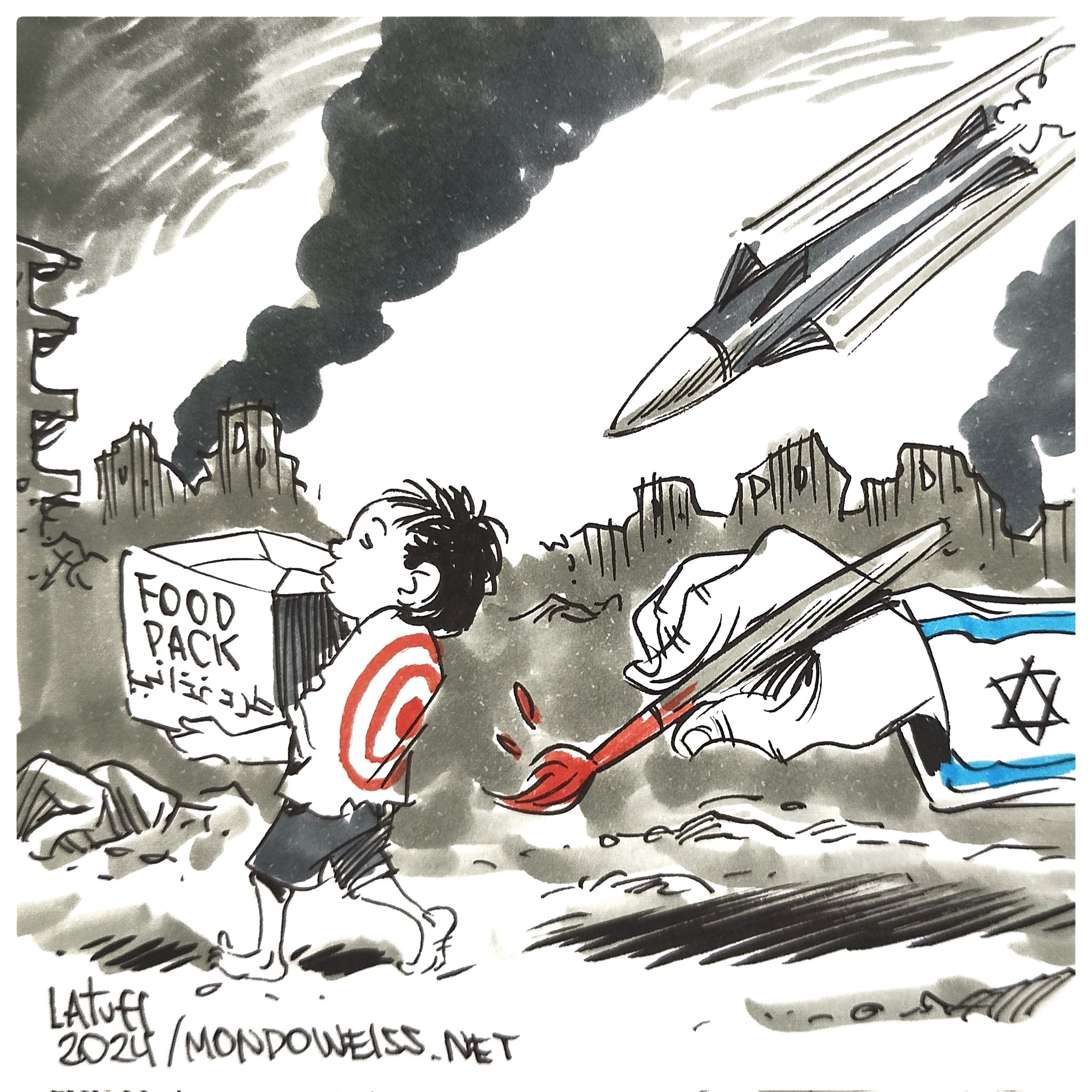
Cartoon by Carlos Latuff criticizing the massacre

=== Palestinian ===
The event was named the Flour Massacre by Palestinians.

Palestinian President Mahmoud Abbas called the incident an "ugly massacre" that was perpetrated by the "Israeli occupation army". The Palestinian National Authority (PNA) condemned the event, saying the civilians were merely trying to get food and much needed supplies and the IDF opened fire, killing innocent citizens and injuring hundreds. The Gaza Health Ministry (GHM) said the incident was part of Israel's "genocidal war" and called for the international community to intervene to forge a ceasefire "as the only way to protect civilians". Following the event, Hamas called it a "heinous massacre added to the long series of massacres committed by the criminal Zionist entity against our Palestinian people".

Husam Zomlot, the Palestinian Ambassador to the United Kingdom, called on the International Criminal Court (ICC) to take action, stating that being "silent is complicit". Mustafa Barghouti, the secretary-general of the Palestinian National Initiative (PNI), criticized Western governments of being: "complicit with these crimes and allow[ing] them to happen". Ramzi Khoury, the head of the Palestinian Committee for Church Affairs, called the attack "unprecedented in the history of war crimes".

=== Israeli ===
Israeli Security Minister Itamar Ben-Gvir praised the Israeli military saying: "Total support must be given to our heroic fighters operating in Gaza, who acted excellently against a Gazan mob that tried to harm them". He further stated the incident was: "another clear reason why we must stop transferring this aid". Eylon Levy, an Israeli spokesman from London, stated, "My heart goes out to the civilians who got trampled in a stampede".

=== International ===
- African Union (AU): Chairperson Moussa Faki Mahamat released a statement saying he: "strongly condemns an attack by Israeli forces, that killed and wounded more than 100 Palestinians seeking life-saving humanitarian aid".
- Algeria: Algeria proposed a motion to the United Nations Security Council (UNSC) to release a statement condemning the massacre, which was blocked by the United States.
- Arab League: Secretary-General Ahmed Aboul Gheit, condemned the massacre committed by the Israel Defense Forces (IDF).
- Australia: Foreign Minister Penny Wong stated: "Australia is horrified by today's catastrophe in Gaza and the ongoing humanitarian crisis that has led to it. These events underscore why for months Australia has been calling for an immediate humanitarian ceasefire in Gaza".
- Belgium: Deputy Prime Minister Petra De Sutter said she was horrified by the news of the massacre.
- Brazil: Brazil condemned the killings, stating that it appeared Israel's operation had no "ethical or legal limits".
- Canada: Foreign Minister Mélanie Joly described the incident as "a nightmare" and called for an end to fighting.
- China: Mao Ning, spokesperson of the Ministry of Foreign Affairs said that: "China urges the relevant parties, especially Israel, to cease fire and end the fighting immediately, earnestly protect civilians' safety, ensure that humanitarian aid can enter, and avoid an even more serious humanitarian disaster".
- Colombia: President Gustavo Petro announced the country would cease importing Israeli weapons after the incident, and he also made a statement, saying: "Asking for food, more than 100 Palestinians were killed by Netanyahu. This is called genocide and recalls the Holocaust. The world must block Netanyahu".
- Egypt: Egypt condemned the Israeli forces' targeting of Palestinians waiting for aid.
- European Union (EU): Josep Borrell, the EU's chief diplomat, said Israel's depriving food from Palestinians was a serious violation of international humanitarian law, and described the incident as "totally unacceptable carnage". Ursula von der Leyen, the European Commission (EC) President, stated she was "deeply disturbed" and called for a full investigation.
- France: France said that Israeli soldiers firing upon civilians attempting to access food was unjustifiable. President Emmanuel Macron stated, "Deep indignation at the images coming from Gaza where civilians have been targeted by Israeli soldiers".
- Germany: Foreign Minister Annalena Baerbock wrote: "The reports from Gaza shock me. The Israeli army must fully explain how the mass panic and shooting could have happened".
- India: The Ministry of External Affairs stated: "Such loss of civilian lives and the larger humanitarian situation in Gaza continues to be a cause for extreme concern".
- Iran: Authorities described the attack as a "barbaric attack by the Zionist regime".
- Italy: Foreign Minister Antonio Tajani stated: "The tragic deaths in Gaza demand an immediate ceasefire... We strongly urge Israel to protect the people in Gaza and to rigorously ascertain facts and responsibilities". Prime Minister Giorgia Meloni expressed "deep dismay and concern".
- Jordan: The Ministry of Foreign Affairs also released a statement condemning the attack, saying: "We condemn the Israeli occupation forces' brutal targeting of the gathering of Palestinians who were waiting for aid on the Nabulsi roundabout near Al-Rashid Street in Gaza".
- Lebanon: The Ministry of Foreign Affairs and Emigrants said the incident fell "within the framework of the policy of mass starvation and extermination of the Palestinian people, which drives them to despair and adds fuel to the fire".
- Malaysia: The Foreign Ministry stated: "The cowardly action of Israel targeting Palestinians, including women and children, is not only illegal under international law, but also a blatant violation of the provisional measures handed down by the International Court of Justice".
- Oman: The Foreign Ministry called the attack a violation of international law and "continuation of the policy of extermination".
- Portugal: Minister of Foreign Affairs João Gomes Cravinho stated: "Deeply shocked by the death in Gaza of over 100 people while waiting to receive aid... We call again for an urgent immediate ceasefire [and] for safe access to humanitarian aid, in compliance with ICJ provisional measures".
- Qatar: The Ministry of Foreign Affairs released a statement saying: "Qatar condemns in the strongest terms the heinous massacre committed by the Israeli occupation, against defenseless civilians who were waiting for humanitarian aid to arrive in Gaza".
- Saudi Arabia: Saudi Arabia said it rejected violations of humanitarian law by any side, under any circumstance, and called for the international community to pressure Israel into opening secure humanitarian corridors for the Gaza Strip.
- Spain: Foreign Minister José Manuel Albares wrote, "The unacceptable nature of what happened in Gaza, with dozens of Palestinian civilians dead as they were waiting for food, underlines the urgency of a ceasefire".
- South Africa: The Department of International Relations and Cooperation stated, "South Africa condemns the massacre of 112 Palestinians and the injury of hundreds more as they sought life-saving aid. This latest atrocity is another breach of international law and in breach of the binding provisional orders of the International Court of Justice".
- Turkey: The Ministry of Foreign Affairs called the attack a crime against humanity and "evidence of Israel's intention to destroy the entire Palestinian population".
- United Arab Emirates (UAE): The Foreign Ministry stated it "strongly condemns the targeting by the Israeli occupation forces of a gathering of thousands of Palestinian residents of the Gaza Strip".
- United States: The United States vetoed a UN Security Council (UNSC) statement that would have condemned Israel for the al-Rashid humanitarian aid incident. The Department of State expressed condolences for the people who were killed or injured, and spokesperson Matthew Miller said they were in touch with the Israeli government and pressing them for answers. President Joe Biden told reporters that his administration was checking two competing versions of the incident, and added that the event would complicate ceasefire talks. Vice President Kamala Harris also sharply criticized Israel for the crisis caused by this and other actions by the Israeli government, stating: "We saw hungry, desperate people approach aid trucks simply trying to secure food for their family... met with gunfire and chaos". On 1 March, Biden stated that the United States would begin delivering civilian aid to Gaza via airdrops.
- Yemen: Yemen said the killings amount to "war crimes and the collective punishment of innocent people".

=== Aid organizations ===
United Nations Secretary-General António Guterres condemned the incident, and said that the desperate citizens in Gaza need urgent help, including those in the north where the UN had been unable to provide aid in over a week. Doctors without Borders released a statement: "We consider Israel responsible for the situation of extreme deprivation and despair which prevails in Gaza — particularly in the north — which led to today's tragic events". Mercy Corps criticized the "deliberate denial of humanitarian access into Gaza City" and expressed "horror at the unnecessary loss of life in Gaza as at least a hundred people are reportedly killed and many more injured at a food distribution in Gaza City". Paula Gaviria Betancur, the UN special rapporteur on the rights of displaced people, stated, "I am horrified by the depravity of killing civilians while they are at their most vulnerable and seeking basic assistance. These constitute atrocity crimes of the highest order".

Catherine M. Russell, the executive director of UNICEF, stated she was "horrified" and called for "safe access to humanitarian aid". In a statement, Refugees International (RI) called for an independent investigation and stated "There is nothing that can justify the killing of civilians desperate to receive lifesaving relief for their families". Martin Griffiths, the UN's humanitarian aid coordinator, stated he was appalled by the attack, saying, "Life is draining out of Gaza at terrifying speed." A representative from the Palestinian Medical Relief Society (PMRS) stated: "This situation is happening every day, it's not the first time". Dennis Francis, the UN General Assembly president, stated he was "shocked and horrified at the reported killing and injury of hundreds of people during disbursement of food supplies". In a statement, a group of UN special rapporteurs called the attack a massacre and stated, "Israel must end its campaign of starvation and targeting of civilians". Human Rights Watch (HRW) stated the attack was part of a "decades-long pattern" of Israel using "unlawful, excessive force against Palestinians".

== Subsequent attacks ==
On March 3, 2024, at least 9 people were reportedly killed in an Israeli attack on an aid truck in Deir al-Balah. On the same day, "dozens of casualties" were reported in another attack on food aid at the Kuwaiti roundabout in southern Gaza City.

On March 14, 2024, Israeli troops fired on Palestinians receiving aid at the Kuwaiti roundabout, killing 21 and injuring more than 150 others.

On March 23, 2024, Israeli troops once again fired on Palestinians waiting for aid at the Kuwaiti roundabout, killing 19 and injuring 23 others in what Gaza's media office called a "massacre".

On June 18, 2024, two Palestinians were killed after Israeli forces bombed al-Rashid Street in Central Gaza.

On August 1, organizations advocating for human rights reported that Israeli forces launched attacks on Palestinians at food distribution sites sponsored by the United States. As reported by Willman from MSF, in August 2025, multiple aid trucks were en route to the Zikim crossing in northern Gaza, where several Palestinians were attempting to access them. Israeli forces launched an attack on these individuals.

== See also ==
- Israeli war crimes
- War crimes in the Gaza war
- World Central Kitchen aid convoy attack
- List of massacres in the Palestinian territories
- Faiq al-Mabhouh § Transport of flour to Gaza City
- Fahmi al-Jarjawi School Massacre
- Rafah aid distribution incidents
- 2025 Gaza Strip aid distribution killings
- Gaza genocide
