= Battle of Shuja'iyya =

Battle of Shuja'iyya may refer to:

- Battle of Shuja'iyya (2014), during the 2014 Gaza War
- Battle of Shuja'iyya (2023), during the Gaza war
- Second Battle of Shuja'iyya (2024), during the Gaza war
- 2025 Shuja'iyya offensive, during the Gaza war
