= April 2025 Shuja'iyya airstrike =

Israeli airstrike in Shuja'iyya

- Part of the 2025 Shuja'iyya offensive during the Gaza war
- Location: Shuja'iyya, Gaza City, Gaza Strip
- Date: 9 April 2025
- Attack type: Airstrikes, war crime
- Deaths: 35+ Palestinians
- Injuries: 70+ Palestinians
- Perpetrator: Israel Defense Forces

On 9 April 2025, the Israel Defense Forces (IDF) conducted an airstrike on a four-story residential building near al-Hawashi mosque in Shuja'iyya, in eastern Gaza City. Israeli warplanes targeted a densely populated area that was overcrowded with refugee tents and displaced people, destroying 8 homes.

The strike killed at least 35 Palestinians, including 8 women and children, injured more than 70 people, and left over 20 missing.

== Background ==
On 18 March 2025, Israel launched a surprise attack on the Gaza Strip, effectively ending the January 2025 Gaza war ceasefire and resuming the Gaza war. On the first day, Israel's attacks killed at least 404 Palestinians, including 263 women and children, making it one of the deadliest days in the Gaza war. Amid the renewed offensive, on 23 March, Israel fired on five ambulances and a fire truck "one-by-one" and killed 15 Palestinian paramedics, an action widely condemned by the international community. It was not until 30 March that the bodies of the missing paramedics were found in a mass grave.

Israel subsequently ordered mass evacuations in Shuja'iyya, citing the need to destroy "terrorist infrastructure", displacing thousands of residents of Shuja'iyya before initiating a renewed offensive.

== Attack ==
On 9 April 2025, Israeli warplanes targeted a four-story residential building in an overcrowded area filled with refugees in Shuja'iyya with "multiple missiles", causing shrapnel to fly "in all directions". The strike destroyed eight homes in Shuja'iyya. Over 35 Palestinians were killed and at least another 70 were injured. Another 20 remained missing. Israel claimed to have struck a "senior Hamas terrorist" without providing evidence and initially without giving their name.

The next day on 10 April, the IDF named the Hamas commander killed as Haitham Razek abd al-Karim Sheikh Khalil. Footage showed dust-covered bodies of children being carried away from the rubble by rescue workers. Some victims were "torn to pieces" while "dust and massive destruction filled the entire place".

== Reactions ==
Hamas condemned the strike as a "bloody massacre" and one of the "most heinous acts of genocide".

== Aftermath and investigation ==
The Israeli Defense Forces (IDF) issued report stating that "professional failures" led to the killing of the 15 workers in Gaza, and that the commander on the ground perceived an immediate and tangible threat after vehicles approached rapidly, blaming "poor night visibility".

The deputy commander of the unit involved was dismissed. The IDF said its investigation found six of the casualties were Hamas members, and rejected that there had been summary executions.

== See also ==
- Timeline of the Israeli–Palestinian conflict in 2025
- Israeli war crimes in the Gaza war
- Gaza genocide
