= Timeline of the Israeli–Palestinian conflict in 2025 =

- Timeline of the Israeli–Palestinian conflict
- 2024; 2025; 2026

The following is a list of events during the Israeli–Palestinian conflict in 2025, including the events of the Gaza war.

== January ==
=== 1 January ===
- Israeli airstrikes across the Gaza Strip kill at least 26 Palestinians, including four children. At least ten others are missing and believed to be buried under rubble.
- The Palestinian Authority suspends Al Jazeera's broadcasts and operations in Palestine, accusing the network of interfering in internal affairs and spreading incitement and misinformation.

=== 2 January ===
- Eleven people are killed, including a Hamas police chief, in an Israeli airstrike on a refugee camp in al-Mawasi in the Gaza Strip.
- Israeli Prime Minister Benjamin Netanyahu's office announces that it has approved a delegation to Doha, Qatar for ceasefire talks.

=== 4 January ===
- At least 70 Palestinians are killed and 14 others are reported missing in Israeli airstrikes on Gaza City and Khan Younis in the Gaza Strip.

=== 5 January ===
- The U.S. State Department notifies Congress of a planned $8 billion arms sale to Israel consisting of air-to-air and Hellfire missiles, artillery shells, and other ammunitions.

=== 6 January ===
- Three Israelis are killed and eight others are injured in a mass shooting attack by Palestinian gunmen firing at a bus and two vehicles on Highway 55 in Al-Funduq in the West Bank.
- More than 50 Haredi Jews join the Israel Defense Forces for the first time since the start of the Gaza war, forming the Haredi Hasmonean Brigade, after repeated protests against the conscription of yeshiva students.

=== 8 January ===
- Israeli airstrikes across the Gaza Strip kill at least 27 people.

=== 9 January ===
- Israeli airstrikes kill 22 Palestinians in the Gaza Strip.

=== 15 January ===
- Israel and Hamas reach a diplomatic agreement to initiate a ceasefire of Gaza Strip military operations and facilitate a hostage exchange, marking the first major cessation of hostilities since the 2023 Gaza war ceasefire.

=== 17 January ===
- Israeli cabinet approves the ceasefire deal.
- Israeli settlers released from administrative detention.

=== 19 January ===
- Ceasefire begins; first Israeli hostages freed.
- IDF recovers the body of soldier Oron Shaul.

=== 20 January ===
- 90 Palestinian prisoners released and returned to West Bank.

=== 25 January ===
- Hamas releases four Israeli female soldiers.
- Israel releases 200 Palestinian prisoners.

=== 27 January ===
- Displaced Palestinians begin returning to northern Gaza.

=== 30 January ===
- Another 90 hostages and 110 Palestinian prisoners freed.
- Hamas confirms deaths of Mohammed Deif and Marwan Issa.

== February ==
=== 8 February ===
- Hamas and Israel carry out a 5th prisoner swap, exchanging three Israelis and 183 Palestinians.

== March ==
=== 18 March ===
- Israel breaks ceasefire and launches “Operation Might and Sword”.
- 855+ Palestinians killed in surprise air and artillery strikes.

=== 19–20 March ===
- Israeli ground forces invade southern and central Gaza, and retakes Netzarim Corridor and pushes into Rafah without warning civilians.

== April ==
=== 2 April ===
- Israeli Defense Minister authorizes expanded land occupation in Gaza.

=== 5 April ===
- First of several mass protests in Tel Aviv and Jerusalem over war policy.

=== 9 April ===
- At least 35 Palestinians are killed after Israeli airstrikes attack Gaza City's Shuja'iiya neighbourhood.

== May ==
=== 7 May ===
- UN experts warn Israel’s actions may amount to “annihilation” of Gaza’s population.

=== 18 May ===
- Israel launches broader Gaza offensive to seize land and relocate civilians.

=== 28–31 May ===
- Mass anti-government protests erupt across Israeli cities, with protesters demanding a hostage release deal and ceasefire in the war with Iran. The Likud Party headquarters was stormed by demonstrators.

== June ==
=== 8 June ===
- The IDF conducts an operation to free 4 hostages from the Nuseirat refugee camp, and kills over 276 Palestinians in the process.
- Arnon Zamora, a Yamam fighter, was killed in the process.

=== 10 June ===
- UN Security Council passes Resolution 2735, and proposes a multi phase plan, demanding an immediate ceasefire, hostage release, humanitarian access, and Israeli withdrawal from the populated areas of Gaza.

== July ==
=== 2 July ===
- Israel orders new evacuations in Khan Younis and Rafah ahead of military operations.

=== 9 July ===
- Major Israeli operations in Tulkarm and Nur Shams displace 40,000 Palestinians.
- Hamas agrees to release 10 hostages in return for Israeli withdrawal from Gaza.

=== 10 July ===
- Ongoing negotiations over U.S.-brokered 60-day ceasefire. Dispute remains over Israeli troops’ presence in Morag Corridor.

=== 26 July ===
- Tens of thousands of people are impacted by evacuation orders directing Gazans to relocate to Al Mawasi.

== September ==
=== 15 September ===
- Netanyahu made the Sparta Speech at the International Convention Center (Jerusalem).

== October ==
=== 16 October ===
- A ten-year-old boy named Muhammad al-Hallaq was killed by Israeli soldiers in Ar-Rihiya, Hebron Governorate. The IDF said that the killing was a response to "confrontations and rock-hurling" directed at the soldiers.

=== 19 October ===
- The Palestinian Ministry of Health said that a 42-year-old Palestinian man named Majed Mohammad Dawoud was killed after Israeli forces raided the Ein Beit al-Ma' refugee camp in Nablus.

== November ==
=== 18 November ===
- A 71-year-old Israeli man died by stab wounds and three others were injured by two Palestinian attackers at Gush Etzion Junction in the West Bank. The perpetrators, both 18-years-old from Hebron, were eventually killed by the IDF.

== December ==
=== 9 December ===
- The Palestinian Authority reported that a 21-year-old Palestinian man from Husan died under Israeli military custody. The man was initially detained by the IDF in June 2025.

=== 11 December ===
- A 16-year-old Palestinian boy was killed after Israeli forces shot him and ran him over with a tank in the Jabalia refugee camp near the Yellow Line.
- The Israeli cabinet approved 19 settler outposts in the West Bank, including two that were evacuated during the 2005 disengagement plan from Gaza.

=== 13 December ===
- The Israeli military announced that senior Hamas commander, Ra'ad Sa'ad was killed by an Israeli attack near Gaza City. Hamas later confirmed the killing and accused Israel of violating the ceasefire.

=== 15 December ===
- A 16-year-old boy was killed by Israeli forces in Tuqu' in the Bethlehem Governorate. The Israeli military claimed that rocks were thrown at soldiers who used riot dispersal means and later responded with fire.

=== 16 December ===
- A 16-year-old Palestinian teenager was killed by an Israeli settler in Tuqu'. An Israeli source claimed that the Israeli civilian opened fire on masked people who were hurling paint bottles and stones at Israeli civilians' cars that were travelling on a nearby main road.

=== 19 December ===
- Five Palestinians, including a baby, were killed by Israeli soldiers over the Yellow Line in Tuffah, Gaza City. Israeli forces claimed that they identified "a number of suspicious individuals … in command structures west of the Yellow Line". The IDF also stated that the incident is "under review" and "regrets any harm to uninvolved individuals."
