= 2023 Gaza siege =

2023 Gaza siege may refer to:

- 2023 Israeli blockade of the Gaza Strip
- Siege of Gaza City
