= Ibn Uthman Mosque =

Destroyed mosque in Gaza City, Gaza Strip, Palestine

- مسجد ابن عثمان
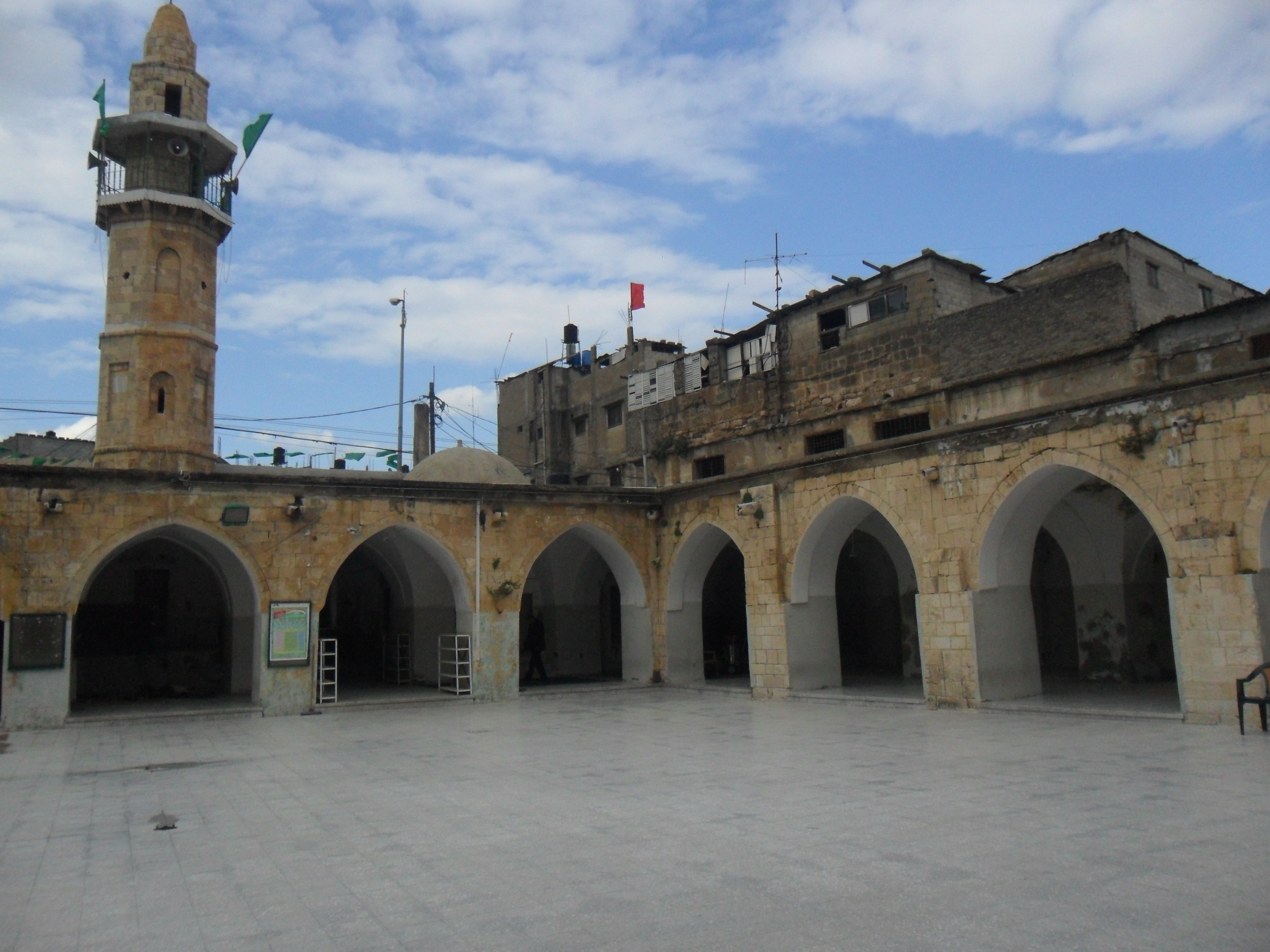
- The mosque in 2017

- Location of the former mosque in Gaza

Religion
- Affiliation: Islam (former)
- Ecclesiastical or organisational status: Mosque
- Status: Destroyed

Location
- Location: Suq Street, Turukman Quarter, Shuja'iyya, Gaza Strip
- Country: Palestine
- Interactive map of Ibn Uthman Mosque
- Coordinates: 31°30′00″N 34°28′10″E

Architecture
- Style: Mamluk
- Groundbreaking: 1399-1400
- Completed: 1430-1431
- Destroyed: 2024 bombing
- Minaret: 1

The Ibn Uthman Mosque (Arabic: مسجد ابن عثمان, romanized: Jami Ibn 'Uthman) is a destroyed mosque situated along Suq Street ("Bazaar Street") in the Turukman Quarter in the southeastern Shuja'iyya district of Gaza City, in the Gaza Strip, in the State of Palestine.

It is regarded as second only to the Great Mosque of Gaza in terms of beauty and status as a Friday mosque. Noted for its architectural patterns, the mosque was established in three different stages during the Burji Mamluk period of rule in Gaza.

The mosque was destroyed in 2024 as part of the Israeli bombing of the Gaza Strip. The large Shuja'iyya Market is located across the building and the mosque lies below street level, with its exterior no longer intact.

== History ==
The mosque was founded by Sheikh Ahmad ibn Muhammad ibn Uthman ibn Umar ibn Abdullah al-Nabulsi al-Maqdisi and its name is attributed to him. Born in Nablus, he moved to Gaza where he became locally well known as a holy man. In 1402-03 Sheikh Ahmad ibn Uthman died in Mecca. Local tradition has it that he was min al-salihin ("of the righteous people.") Although there are no inscriptions in the mosque that mention Sheikh Ahmad ibn Uthman, literary sources from the Mamluk era confirm the mosque was named after him.

In 1394-95 Emir Arzamak assigned the surplus of the Shuja'iyya marketplace, four shops bordering the Ibn Marwan Mosque and his residence in Gaza to a waqf ("religious endowment") dedicated to the maintenance of the Ibn Uthman mosque. Other revenue from this waqf was allocated to the madrasa ("Islamic law school"), kuttab ("boys' elementary school"), sabil ("public fountain") and bread distribution center Arzamak founded.

The initial components of the mosque, including its double-entrance western facade, the first few room spaces behind the facade and the minaret were not laid out until 1399-1400. According to one inscription in the mosque, this first stage of construction occurred under the auspices of the Emir Aqbugha ibn al-Tulutumari. However, because Emir Aqbugha's term as governor of Gaza ended prior to 1398, it is likelier that building work on the mosque, or reconstruction of some of its parts, started during his term but ended after his reassignment to Karak in 1399. A second inscription credits Emir Azdamur, the Circassian general of Sultan Barquq, as the mosque's founder on 18 April 1398.

The mosque was either largely demolished or destroyed prior to 1418 according to an inscription placed above the mihrab in the courtyard. Sultan Mu'ayyad Shaykh commissioned the mosque's second stage of construction on 13 September 1418. In addition to restoring the original mosque, this project, which was supervised by Shaykh's emir, Abu Bakr al-Yaghmuri, the head of the sultan's guard in Gaza, saw the construction of the courtyard and the portico positioned in front of the qibla wall. The current size and architectural form of the building is attributed to Shaykh's works. Emir Alam al-Din Sanjar oversaw the final building stage in 1430-31. He had the northern and southern porticoes as well as the main mihrab and its dome constructed. Other repairs were undertaken as well.

According to Muslim scholar and historian al-Sakhawi, the mosque is also the tomb of one of Gaza's short-lived governors, Sa'd al-Din Yilkhuja al-Nasiri, writing "He was buried in the mosque of Ibn Uthman, outside Gaza." Yilkhuja was an emir of Sultan Barquq and later, Sultan Nasir al-Faraj, who requested burial in the mosque before he died in Gaza in August 1446. An inscription dated from 13 February 1450 commemorates Sultan Jaqmaq's decree abolishing the taxation of imported salt in Gaza is fixed above the mosque's entrance.

In July 2024, the mosque was destroyed by an Israeli airstrike during an offensive in the area, as part of its invasion of Gaza. As of February 2026, UNESCO confirmed that the mosque was one of more than 150 cultural properties with damage, assessed on satellite imagery.

== Architecture ==
The plan of the Ibn Uthman Mosque follows the traditional layout of Mamluk-era mosques. Its total area is 45 by 36.5 metres (148 by 120 ft), making it the second largest Muslim edifice in Gaza. A courtyard measuring 30.8 by 27.9 metres (101 by 92 ft) is situated in the center of the complex and is bordered on all four sides by porticoes. There are two entrance portals both situated at the western facade. Between the two portals stands the minaret which consists of a base, a double-story octagonal shaft, and a gallery. Behind the facade are three chambers, one of which is occupied by the tomb of Yilkhuja al-Nasiri. The other two serve various functions.

The four porticoes are each divided into two parts by rows of pillars, all of which are covered by cross-vaults. The original portico was built in front of the qibla ("direction towards Kaaba"). The northern and southern porticoes contain pointed arches carried by square pillars.

Consisting of a semi-circular niche topped by a dome, the mihrab ("prayer niche" directed towards Kaaba) of Emir Sanjar is a "unique masterpiece" according to Islamic architecture expert Mu'en Sadeq. The mihrab is inlaid with marble plating. The minbar ("pulpit") is also built out of marble.

== See also ==
- List of mosques in Palestine
- Islam in Palestine
- Attacks on religious sites during the Israeli invasion of Gaza
- Destruction of cultural heritage during the Gaza war
- List of archaeological sites in the Gaza Strip
