= Killing of Mohammad Bhar =

Killing of mentally disabled Palestinian man by Israeli forces

- Part of the Gaza war
- Photo of Mohammad Bhar in his room
- Location: 31°30′02″N 34°28′12″E; Shuja'iyya, Gaza City, Gaza Strip
- Date: 3 July 2024
- Attack type: Dog attack
- Deaths: 1
- Victims: Mohammad Bhar, aged 24
- Perpetrator: Israeli Ground Forces

Mohammad Bhar (Arabic: محمد بهار; 2000 – July 2024) was a 24-year-old Palestinian man with Down syndrome and autism who died after being mauled by an Israeli Oketz military dog in a Gaza Strip house during the Gaza war.

Bhar had speech difficulties and was unable to move without assistance from his family. According to his family, they had been displaced at least six times since the Gaza war erupted in late 2023. They stated that the Israel Defense Forces (IDF) raided the house where they were besieged on 3 July 2024; the forces included a combat dog which mauled Bhar's arm and chest. Israeli forces then separated Bhar from them, giving assurances that he would be treated by a military doctor, and later forced them to leave the house.

When the family returned to the house a week later, they found Bhar's bloodied, decaying body on the floor and a tourniquet on his arm. Israel later confirmed that the soldiers left Bhar in the apartment, saying they departed to help other injured soldiers.

Mohammad's killing provoked outrage on social media websites, and his family demanded an investigation into the incident. The BBC, which reported on the incident, was criticized for obscuring the Israeli military's role.

== Background ==
Mohammad Bhar was a Palestinian born in the Gaza Strip in 2000. He had Down syndrome and autism and was bullied in school. According to his family, Bhar liked to dance, play sports, and eat mulukhiyah, which is a popular dish in Palestinian cuisine. He was also deeply attached to his mother, Nabila, a widow who had lost her husband after he was killed by the Israel Defense Forces (IDF) during a raid in eastern Gaza City in 2002.

By 2023, Bhar was unable to move without assistance from his family members and spent most of the time sitting in his armchair. His mother told Middle East Eye (MEE) that Bhar was obese. She told the BBC that: "He didn't know how to eat, drink, or change his clothes. I'm the one who changed his nappies. I'm the one who fed him. He didn't know how to do anything by himself".

== Killing ==
Since the start of the Israeli invasion of the Gaza Strip of the Gaza war, Bhar's family said they had been displaced at least six times and had to evacuate 15 times, escaping from Israeli bombing of the Gaza Strip. On 27 June the fighting returned to Shuja'iyya, during the second battle of Shuja'iyya, and the Israel Defense Forces (IDF) ordered residents to evacuate. By then, the Bhar family were weary from moving. In July 2024, the Bhar family was hiding at one of their relatives' house in the Shuja'iyya neighborhood of Gaza City, where the Israeli military was in pursuit of Hamas militants. The Bhar family said they were under siege for seven days as Israeli forces surrounded the house, and that Mohammad panicked at the sounds of shells and fighter jets surrounding them.

On 3 July 2024, the family said an Israeli military unit raided their house on Nazaz Street. The unit consisted of several dozen soldiers and a combat dog used to check for explosives, booby traps, and to find Hamas fighters. The dog, which was sent into the house first, began attacking Bhar. Bhar's mother Nabila recalled that the Israeli forces smashed everything in the house when they broke in. When the soldiers arrived in their room, she told them: "He's disabled, disabled. Have mercy on him, he's disabled. Keep the dog away from him".

His mother also recalled how the dog then proceeded to attack Mohammad, biting his chest and hand, leaving him bleeding. She said that Mohammad, who had speech difficulties, was screaming at the dog, saying: "wala, wala [hey you]", and at other times: "khalas, ya habibi" [enough, my dear]". The BBC reported that he was patting the dog's head. The mother said that Israeli soldiers then took Bhar to another room away from the dog, while pointing their guns at the rest of the family and telling them that a military doctor would soon arrive. The soldiers tried to treat his wounds, and a military doctor came later. After several hours, Israeli soldiers ordered the Bhar family to leave at gunpoint, and arrested two of Mohammad's brothers, who were not released by 17 July 2024, according to the family. The rest of the family said they sought shelter at a damaged building nearby.

The Bhar family tried to contact the Palestine Red Crescent Society (PRCS) to ask for their assistance, but were informed that the Israeli authorities were not cooperating with their requests. The family said they later returned to the house a week later and found Mohammad's bloodied body lying on the floor and beginning to decay, with worms starting to eat his face. His brother showed the BBC a cellphone video of the scene. A tourniquet was on Bhar's arm, and there was gauze that was used to dress a wound. His brother also said that Bhar had been left by Israeli forces without stitching his wounds or providing any additional care. The BBC reported that it was unclear which of Bhar's injuries was the cause of death. Mohammad was buried in an alley near the house, as it was too dangerous to transport his body to a graveyard or to the mortuary, according to the family.

== Aftermath ==
Mohammad Bhar's killing provoked outrage on social media websites, and his family demanded an investigation into his killing. The Israeli military said in response to a BBC query that the troops left Bhar in the house alone because there were soldiers injured in a rocket attack somewhere else that needed their help. The military said that the soldiers left Bhar after giving him first aid. His mother Nabila, who was 70 years old at the time of the killing, told the BBC that:

"This scene I will never forget [...] I constantly see the dog tearing at him and his hand, and the blood pouring from his hand [...] It is always in front of my eyes, never leaving me for a moment. We couldn't save him, neither from them nor from the dog."

A similar incident was reported a month prior to Mohammad's killing: Al Jazeera posted footage from a camera attached to a dog accompanying Israeli forces, that showed it dragging and biting an elderly Palestinian woman in her home.

The BBC's report was criticized by activists who considered the original headline ("Gaza man with Down's syndrome dies lonely death") to be obscuring the Israeli military's responsibility in the incident; the headline was later changed to "Gaza man with Down's syndrome attacked by IDF dog and left to die, mother tells BBC". The New Arab reported that the attack was not mentioned until the article's 16th paragraph, nearly halfway through the article.

According to Euro Med Human Rights Monitor, the Israeli military has used dogs to attack civilians at least 146 times in the Gaza war.

A Dutch ship in the September 2025 Global Sumud Flotilla was named for Bhar.

== See also ==
- Israeli war crimes in the Gaza war
- Gaza genocide
- Killing of Hind Rajab
