= 2025 Shuja'iyya offensive =

Military engagement in the Gaza war

- Part of the Israeli invasion of the Gaza Strip during the Gaza war
Date	4 April – 20 August 2025 (1 year, 6 months and 4 weeks)
Location	Shuja'iyya and Tuffah, Gaza City, Gaza Strip, Palestine
Result	Inconclusive: Offensive merges into a broader offensive on Gaza City on 20 August 2025

Belligerents
Israel (Palestine) (Fatah) Shuja'iyya Popular Defense Forces administration	Gaza; Palestinian Joint Operations Room; Hamas; Palestinian Islamic Jihad; Palestinian Mujahideen Movement; Popular Front for the Liberation of Palestine; Al-Aqsa Martyrs' Brigades

Commanders and leaders
(Israel) Avi Rosenfeld (Israel) Meir Biderman (Israel) Nir Ifergan (Fatah) Rami Hilles (Fatah) Ahmad Jundeya	(Hamas) Muhammad al-‘Ajlah X (Hamas) Muhammad Uthayn X (Hamas) Haytham Sheikh Khalil X (Palestinian Islamic Jihad) Fadl Abu al-Ata X

Units involved
Israel Defense Forces; Israeli Ground Forces; Southern Command; 162nd Division; 401st Brigade; 46th Battalion; 252nd Division; Jerusalem Brigade; 6310th Battalion; 7007th Battalion; Israeli Air Force; Israel Police; Israeli Border Police; Yamas; (Palestine) (Fatah) Shuja'iyya Popular Defense Forces	(Palestine) Palestinian Joint Operations Room; (Hamas) Al-Qassam Brigades; Gaza Brigade; Shuja'iyya Battalion; Al-Quds Brigades; Gaza Brigade; Shuja'iyya Battalion; Turukman Battalion; Mujahideen Brigades; Abu Ali Mustafa Brigades; Al-Aqsa Martyrs' Brigades

Casualties and losses
(Israel) 5 soldiers killed (Note: Sources:) (Israel) 1 policeman killed	(Palestine) Several militants killed
- ~81 Palestinian civilians killed

On 4 April 2025, Israel began a ground offensive into the Shuja'iyya neighborhood of Gaza City, as part of its renewed military operations in the Gaza Strip following the resumption of the Gaza war on 18 March. It marked the third time Israel invades the neighborhood during the war, following battles in 2023 and 2024.

== Background ==
During the Gaza war, the IDF had launched multiple offensives and incursions into the Shuja'iyya neighbourhood in Gaza City, including a direct battle in 2023 and an incursion 2024 both of which had ended in Israeli military withdrawals.

A ceasefire that halted fighting in the Gaza war between Israel and Hamas was implemented on 19 January 2025, but collapsed on 18 March after an Israeli surprise attack on the Gaza Strip. Following the war's resumption, Israel partially retook the Netzarim Corridor and renewed its Rafah offensive.

On 3 April, Israel Defense Forces (IDF) spokesman Brigadier General Effie Defrin announced that it has begun a “new stage” designed to return the Israeli hostages held by Hamas and destroy the militant group's "military and governing capabilities.”

That same day, an Israeli bombardment of Shuja'iyya killed at least 37 people.

== Timeline ==
=== 4 April ===
The IDF launched the ground operation in the morning with the intent of expanding the Israeli buffer zone along the Gaza border, saying that Palestinian civilians had been allowed to evacuate Shuja'iyya. The IDF also reported it destroyed a Hamas command-and-control centre during its assault.

A woman and her daughter were killed in an Israeli artillery attack targeting displaced people in the neighborhood.

=== 5 April ===
Israeli forces halted the flow of water from Israeli company Mekorot to the Gaza Strip, effectively cutting off 70% of Gaza's total water supply and affecting Gaza's main pipeline, located in Shuja'iyya.

One Palestinian was killed following artillery shelling in the al-Salem Mosque.

=== 6 April ===
Palestinian Islamic Jihad (PIJ) stated that its Al-Quds Brigades fighters destroyed an Israeli military vehicle in the neighborhood.

=== 9 April ===
Israel struck a residential building in Shuja'iyya with multiple bombs. Additionally, eight houses around the building were destroyed by the bombardment, killing at least 35 Palestinians, injuring over 70, and leaving over 20 missing. Israel claimed to have targeted a senior Hamas militant, without providing their name.

=== 10 April ===
The IDF stated that Haytham Sheikh Khalil, the commander of the Al-Qassam Brigades' Shuja'iyya Battalion, was the militant killed in the previous day's airstrike, and claimed that the residential building was in reality a command-and-control centre.

=== 12 April ===
Palestinians in Shuja'iyya were reported to be "trapped", with Israeli tanks surrounding the neighborhood. Sources from the ground also reported that the IDF was shooting whoever was moving or trying to move from one place to another.

Al-Qassam Brigades militants ambushed Israeli soldiers in Shuja'iyya, resulting in two casualties and several injuries, while the Al-Quds Brigades announced their killing of an Israeli sniper atop Al-Muntar Hill, which overlooks the neighborhood.

=== 15 April ===
Israel said it launched an airstrike on Shuja'iyya that killed the new commander of the Shuja'iyya Battalion, Muhammad al-‘Ajlah, a week after his predecessor Khalil had been killed.

=== 25 April ===
Clashes between the IDF and the Al-Qassam Brigades were reported in Shuja'iyya, resulting in the killing of one IDF soldier and one Israeli police officer.

=== 3 May ===
An Israeli airstrike on the neighborhood killed 10 civilians.

=== 10 May ===
A landmine explosion in Shuja'iyya resulted in injuries among an Israeli force that was combing the area. According to the Al-Quds Brigades, the landmine was planted as part of an ambush that they set up in the neighborhood.

=== 26 May ===
The Al-Qassam Brigades reported that its fighters targeted IDF soldiers with rockets and detonated a minefield against another Israeli force that had infiltrated east of Shuja'iyya.

The Mujahideen Brigades of the Mujahideen Movement reported they had shot down an Israeli drone flying over Shuja'iyya.

=== 3 June ===
The Al-Qassam Brigades launched a drone attack against a group of IDF soldiers in Shuja'iyya, causing one casualty and several injuries.

=== 7 June ===
The Mujahideen Brigades shelled a group of IDF soldiers east of Shuja'iyya, causing one injury.

=== 9 June ===
Israeli bombings killed a total of 11 people in Shuja'iyya and the adjacent Zeitoun neighborhood.

=== 13 June ===
The Abu Ali Mustafa Brigades of the Popular Front for the Liberation of Palestine (PFLP) reported that they shelled Israeli troops east of Shuja'iyya.

=== 17 June ===
The Al-Quds Brigades stated that they shot down and captured an Israeli drone that was reportedly gathering intelligence around a local mosque in the neighborhood.

=== 22 June ===
The Al-Aqsa Martyrs' Brigades stated that they shelled Israeli forces at Al-Muntar Hill.

=== 30 June ===
The IDF reportedly carried out a "wide wave of airstrikes" on Shuja'iyya.

=== 3 July ===
Ynet reported that the Fatah-affiliated Hilles clan, supposedly led by Rami Hilles, was operating in Shuja'iyya and receiving Israeli protection and operational cover. The Hilles clan later denied any collaboration with Israel, with the Rami Hilles group appearing to actually be a "rogue faction" (the Shuja'iyya Popular Defense Forces) that has been disavowed by clan leadership.

=== 17 July ===
Clashes between the IDF and Palestinian militants resulted in injuries to five Israeli soldiers.

== See also ==
- May 2025 Gaza offensive
- Battle of Khan Yunis (2025)
- 2025 Beit Hanoun offensive and siege
- Siege of Gaza City
- Gaza genocide
