= Aybaki Mosque =

Mosque in Gaza City, Palestine

Al-Aybaki Mosque
- مسجد الأيبكي
- Location of the mosque in Gaza

Religion
- Affiliation: Sunni Islam
- Ecclesiastical or organisational status: Mosque
- Status: Destroyed

Location
- Location: Tuffah, Gaza
- Country: Palestine
- Interactive map of Al-Aybaki Mosque
- Coordinates: 31°30′30″N 34°28′07″E

Architecture
- Style: Mamluk
- Founder: Mamluk dynasty
- Completed: 13th century

The Al-Aybaki Mosque (Arabic: مسجد الأيبكي), also referred to as the Mosque of Sheikh Abdullah al-Aybaki (Arabic transliteration: Jami ash-Shaykh 'Abdallah al-Aybaki), was a mosque situated in the al-Tuffah neighborhood of Gaza City, in the State of Palestine. It was destroyed by an Israeli airstrike on 16 September 2025.

Built by the Mamluks in the late 13th century, the mosque is named after Sheikh Abdullah al-Aybaki, a Muslim religious leader. According to his nisba "Aybaki", Sheikh Abdullah was a mamluk or relative of Izz al-Din Aybak, the first Mamluk sultan of Egypt. Sheikh Abdullah's son Sheikh Iyad was buried nearby at the Sayed al-Hashim Mosque in al-Daraj while his other son Ahmad al-Aybaki, a local saintly person, was buried in a sanctuary called al-Mazar ash-Sheikh Aybak.

On 16 September 2025 at 6:24 P.M., the Aybaki Mosque destroyed along with at least 16 residential buildings as part of Israel's 2025 Gaza City offensive.

== See also ==
- Islam in Palestine
- List of archaeological sites in the Gaza Strip
- List of mosques in Palestine
