= Siege of Gaza City =

Military engagement in Gaza City

- Part of the Israeli invasion of the Gaza Strip, the insurgency in the northern Gaza Strip, and the Gaza war
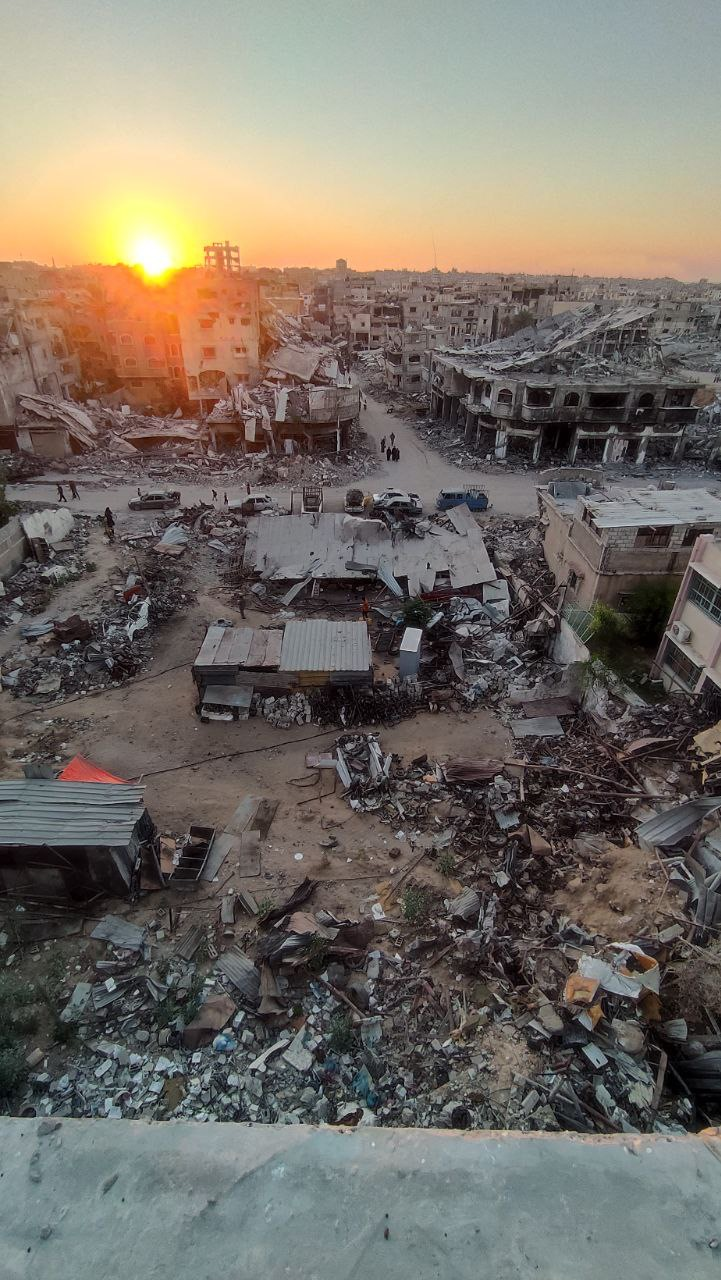
- Besieged Gaza City in June 2024
Date	2 November 2023 – 19 January 2025 (2 years, 9 months, 2 weeks and 6 days)
Location	Gaza City, Gaza Strip
Result	Ceasefire; siege relieved

Belligerents
Israel	Gaza

Units involved
Israel Defense Forces; Israeli Ground Forces; Golani Brigade; Nahal Brigade; 401st Brigade; Paratroopers Brigade; Givati Brigade; Israeli Combat Engineering Corps; 99th Infantry Division; 460th Brigade; 39th Division; 179th Armored Brigade; 143rd (Gaza) Division; 215th Artillery Brigade; Israeli Air Force; Shaldag Unit; Israeli Navy	(Palestine) Palestinian Joint Operations Room; (Hamas) Al-Qassam Brigades; (Hamas) Gaza Brigade; Sabra-Tal al Islam Battalion; Daraj wal Tuffah Battalion; Radwan Battalion; Shujaiya Battalion; Zaytoun Battalion; Shati Battalion; (Hamas) Central Brigade; (Palestinian Islamic Jihad) Al-Quds Brigades; (Popular Front for the Liberation of Palestine) Abu Ali Mustafa Brigades; National Resistance Brigades; Al-Nasser Salah al-Deen Brigades; Palestinian Security Services; Palestinian Police

Casualties and losses
(Israel) 155+ soldiers killed	(Democratic Front for the Liberation of Palestine) 2+ fighters killed
- ~10,000 civilians crushed under rubble (per the Palestinian Civil Defence); At least 27 dead from famine

The siege of Gaza City was an engagement of the Gaza war that began on 2 November 2023, when the Israel Defense Forces (IDF) surrounded Gaza City, amid the Israeli invasion of the Gaza Strip after the October 7 attacks. Gaza City is the most populated city in the Gaza Strip and the battle started on 30 October 2023, when Israel and Hamas clashed in Gaza City. According to Oxfam, about 500,000 Palestinians, along with 200 Israelis and other captives, were trapped in a "siege within a siege" in northern Gaza.

The siege ended on 19 January 2025 with the implementation of a ceasefire between Israel and Hamas earlier that day, and with Hamas retaining control over Gaza City.

== Siege ==
=== November 2023 ===
==== 2 November ====
On 2 November, Israeli troops encircled Gaza City as the Palestinian death toll rose above 9,000. Israeli troops met fierce resistance upon advancing towards the gates of Gaza city. Hamas and Palestinian Islamic Jihad (PIJ) fighters left their tunnels to fire at incoming Israeli tanks, before heading back into their large underground network. The Israel Defense Forces (IDF) reported to have lost the commander of its 53rd battalion in the battle, Lieutenant-Colonel Salman Habaka, who was believed to be the most senior Israeli officer killed since Israeli ground operations in the Gaza Strip began on 27 October.

Israel acknowledged that Hamas was "well-prepared" for the battle, saying that there were "minefields and booby traps" that hindered access to the city. A resident of Gaza City reported that Israel shelled the city throughout the whole night but still could not advance through city limits. The Israel Defense Forces (IDF) published the names of five soldiers who were killed during combat on 2 November, raising the total number of Israeli soldiers killed since the invasion of the Gaza Strip to 24.

An Israeli airstrike destroyed a residential building in Bureij refugee camp south of Gaza City, killing at least 15 and burying dozens more under rubble. The airstrike took place in the southern zone of the Gaza Strip, which Israel had ordered residents of northern Gaza to evacuate to on 13 October. On the same day, Israeli airstrikes bombed an area of apartment towers in the Tel al-Hawa neighborhood, just 100 meters away from al-Quds Hospital, according to the Palestinian Red Crescent Society (PRCS).

==== 3 November ====
On 3 November, an Israeli drone missile targeted a medical convoy of ambulances that were carrying 15–20 critically wounded patients near the front gate of al-Shifa Hospital, who were leaving to the Rafah Border Crossing with Egypt to seek treatment abroad. On the same day, an Israeli airstrike bombed Osama bin Zaid school in northern Gaza, which was run by the United Nations Relief and Works Agency for Palestine Refugees in the Near East (UNRWA), killing over 20 people. The UNRWA said that at least 1,000 people took refuge in the school since the start of the war. Israel said it have lost 18 soldiers and killed dozens of militants on 3 November.

==== 4 November ====
On 4 November, Israeli forces bombed the UN-run al-Fakhoora school in Jabalia refugee camp, which had been sheltering displaced people, killing at least 15 people and wounding 54, mostly women and children. Israel had also targeted solar panels and generators, including solar panels on top of hospitals. These were the only source of electricity in Gaza since Israel imposed a total blockade on the Gaza Strip on 9 October. The Israeli army had bombed the Ali bin Abi Talib and al-Istijabah mosques in al-Sabra neighborhood. Hamas' al-Qassam Brigades said that their fighters have killed 5 more Israeli soldiers in a building northwest of Gaza City, after attacking the force with machine guns and bombs. Al-Qassam Brigades have stated that they are fighting on multiple fronts, including northwest of Gaza City, south of Gaza City, in Beit Hanoun and the northeastern Gaza Strip. Hamas fighters have destroyed 24 Israeli military vehicles, including a tank, an armoured personnel carrier, and a bulldozer with anti-armour weapons, notably 105mm al-Yassin rocket-propelled grenades in the past two days.

==== 5 November ====
On 5 November, the Israel Defense Forces (IDF) bombed al-Maghazi refugee camp in central Gaza, killing at least 30 to 51 people, mostly women and children. The Israeli bombing destroyed the Sam'an family's home in the refugee camp and caused severe damage to neighboring homes and infrastructure.

The IDF released footage of fighting near the Hamad Hospital (officially the Sheikh Hamad bin Khalifa al-Thani Hospital for Rehabilitation and Prosthetics), including Hamas fighters firing from the hospital and using tunnels near the hospital building. Daniel Hagari, the head of the IDF Spokesperson's Unit, said in a statement that Israel had fully surrounded Gaza City; Israeli media indicated that the IDF was going to enter the city itself in two days. Communication outages were also reported in Gaza due to the fighting.

==== 7 November ====
On 7 November, Israel said it have reached the "heart of Gaza City", however there is no evidence or indication on the ground that Israeli forces pushed further into the city. Hamas announced that its fighters were inflicting heavy losses and damage on advancing Israeli forces. Prime Minister Benjamin Netanyahu suggested a plan for Israel to be responsible for Gaza's overall security for an "indefinite period" after the war, although this was opposed by the United States. U.S. President Joe Biden argued that "a reoccupation by Israeli forces of Gaza is not the right thing to do".

==== 8 November ====
On 8 November, 50,000 Gazans fled south via the evacuation window according to the Israeli government, amid fighting between Hamas and Israeli forces in Gaza City. Some compared the mass movements to the Nakba of 1948. Daniel Hagari said that the IDF were destroying underground tunnels of Hamas and seizing weapons, including more than 700 RPGs. It is unclear whether Israeli troops were fighting inside the city.

An Israeli airstrike on a house near a hospital in Jabalia refugee camp killed at least 19 people. As a result of the Israeli total blockade of Gaza, al-Quds Hospital ran out of fuel and was forced to shut down most operations, while also suffering daily Israeli bombardments around the medical complex since 5 November. The hospital turned off its main generator and resorted to operating a smaller generator to provide essential services to its 500 patients and 14,000 internally displaced people sheltering there.

==== 9 November ====
On 9 November, Israel launched a "series of violent raids" in northern Gaza, creating a "fire belt" in the eastern side of northern Gaza, according to the Palestinian Interior Ministry. Israeli jets bombed several homes in Deir el-Balah in central Gaza, killing at least 7 Palestinians. An Israeli airstrike bombed al-Buraq School in Lababidi Street in the al-Nasr neighbourhood, north of Gaza City, which was being used by the UNRWA as a shelter. At least 50 people were killed in the attack, with multiple injuries reported.

The Israeli military said it have killed 50 Hamas fighters in Gaza City in the last few days. Hamas said that an Israeli soldier held captive in Gaza was killed and another was injured in an Israeli air raid on central Gaza.

==== 10 November ====
On 10 November, at least 50 people were killed after Israeli missiles and artillery attacked a school in Gaza sheltering internally displaced people. Israeli tanks surrounded several hospitals in Gaza according to health officials, while al-Shifa hospital came under attack five times within 24 hours. By 10 November, over 50% of housing units across Gaza were destroyed by relentless Israeli bombardment.

==== Siege of the Al-Shifa Hospital (11–15 November) ====
Starting on 11 November, the Israel Defense Forces (IDF) began a siege of the al-Shifa Hospital, the largest medical complex in Gaza, based on intelligence that Hamas' command center is under the hospital. The Israeli army directly attacked the hospital, where thousands of wounded and displaced people are trapped amid heavy bombardment. The situation at al-Shifa Hospital is part of a serious healthcare crisis in Gaza. The hospital is rapidly running out of electricity, food and medical supplies. The last generator ran out of fuel, killing three premature babies and four other patients. Another 36 children are at risk of death. On 15 November, the IDF raided the hospital.

==== 18 November ====
On 18 November, Israeli airstrikes over 80 civilians in Jabalia refugee camp in north Gaza.

==== 21 November ====
On 21 November, the IDF moved its frontline to encircle Jabalia refugee camp where they were fighting Palestinian militants.

==== 24 November ====
On 24 November, the Israeli army withdrew from al-Shifa hospital. According to Middle East Eye (MEE), Israel failed to produce much evidence that Hamas was using the hospital as a "command and control centre" despite controlling the hospital for over a week.

=== December 2023 ===
==== 13 December ====
Nine IDF soldiers of the Golani Brigade including Lieutenant-Colonel Tomer Greenberg was killed in an ambush while trying to help a group of IDF soldiers that were caught in an ambush resulting in one of the largest losses for the IDF during the invasion.

==== 18 December ====
The IDF announced that Golani Brigade's 13th Battalion and 188th Armored Brigade captured the Palestine Square in Gaza City's Shuja'iyya neighborhood releasing footage of IDF demolishing the Hamas war monument that celebrated the ambush of an Israeli APC during the 2014 battle of Shuja'iyya The Shuja'iyya Battalion of Hamas was also under heavy pressure due Israel destroying its command centers and infrastructure but Shuja'iyya remained an established stronghold of Hamas with heavy fighting.

==== 19 December ====
The IDF reported the destruction of the three Hamas battalions operating in Jabalia and that Palestinian militant deaths in Jabalia had reached 1000 although a few militia fighters were still fighting in the Jabalia area. The Institute for the Study of War (ISW) and the Critical Threats Project (CTP) estimated that Hamas's North Gaza Brigade had been significantly degraded.

Palestinian militias continued to attack Israeli advances east of Jabalia with the al-Qassam Brigades claiming two attacks on Israeli forces using thermobaric rockets and rocket-propelled grenades (RPG) in Tal al-Zaatar refugee camp, north of Jabalia together with mortar attacks by al-Quds Brigades. The al-Aqsa Martyrs' Brigades and al-Nasser Salah al-Deen Brigades also claimed to have attacked Israeli forces. Palestinian militants used the relative safety of the Central Governorate to attack Israeli forces in and around the Gaza City.

==== 20 December ====
CTP-ISW assessed that the al-Qassam Brigades' Sabra-Tal al-Islam (Tel al-Hawa) Battalion is degraded but is still combat effective. Al-Qassem Brigades continued attacks against advancing Israeli forces as well as resisting Israeli clearing operations behind Israeli frontline. Reported Hamas attacks included an ambush of eight-vehicle Israeli convoy in Sabra and Tel al-Hawa and detonating anti-personnel IEDs in Zaytun neighborhood, southern Gaza City.

==== 21 December ====
The IDF reported operations in the Bakshi neighborhood, south of Gaza City against the Nuseirat Battalion from the Hamas Central Gaza Strip Brigade. Israel began expanding the offensive towards Central Gaza which had been used by Hamas and allies to carry out attacks against IDF forces in the Gaza City.

The IDF announced the "operational control" of Shuja'iyya and the destruction of the Hamas Shuja'iyya Battalion with IDF saying that the Battalion has not carried out attacks in the past week. However Palestinian militias other than Hamas continued to battle Israeli forces around Shujaiya and surrounding neighborhoods with The Al-Aqsa Martyrs' Brigades and Al-Quds Brigades reporting continued fighting with IDF.

==== 22 December ====
Continued fighting reported in Rimal neighborhood as the IDF located and destroyed a vast underground complex used by Hamas leadership. Palestinian forces south of Gaza City continued attempts to repel the Israeli advances into the central Gaza Strip from South of Gaza City and fighting continued in Juhor ad-Dik where rocket launchers targeting Israel were captured by the IDF.

The IDF reported that Israeli forces were clearing Jabalia building-by-building which are used by Palestinian fighters to hide and fire at Israeli forces with small arms. The al-Quds Brigades and the al-Qassam Brigades claimed a combined ambush on Israeli forces inside a house east of Jabalia while Abu Ali Mustafa Brigades fired RPGs at IDF forces advancing in the Sheikh Radwan neighborhood which is believed by the ISW to retain significant Palestinian militia defensive capabilities. The Radwan Battalion was assessed to be combat effective despite being under intense IDF pressure.

The 13th Battalion of the Golani Brigade was rotated out of the Gaza Strip for a 48-hour resting period after 21 days of intense combat in Shuja'iyya during which the unit reported the successful clearing of Shuja'iyya while suffering 44 deaths since 7 October. Palestinian militias and Iranian media claimed this as an Israeli defeat.

==== 23 December ====
Palestinian forces continued attacks in Jabalia and Sheikh Radwan neighborhood of Gaza City using anti-personnel munitions, RPGs, and thermobaric rockets. Sheikh Radwan neighborhood remains one of the remaining areas in Gaza City where Palestinian militias continue to claim nearly daily attacks on Israeli forces. Israeli special operations forces located a Hamas headquarters south of Gaza City consisting of a multi-level tunnel network connected with water and electrical infrastructure that allowed Hamas fighters to move between different sectors of the city.

==== 26 December ====
The IDF said it have cleared two schools and seized IEDs in UNRWA bags. Palestinian militias continued to resist Israeli forces in Daraj wal Tuffah with the al-Qassam Brigades and al-Quds Brigades using combined sniper and RPG fire against dismounted IDF infantry.

The IDF's 36th Division which fought in Gaza City's neighborhoods of Zeitoun, Shuja'iyya, Rimal, and al-Shati refugee camp moved out of the city and advanced towards Central Gaza against Hamas' Bureij Battalion.

=== January 2024 ===
==== 7 January ====
The IDF Nahal Brigade Combat Team under the 162nd Division discovered a large weapons factory during raids in Daraj and Tuffah neighborhoods together with Israeli special operations forces (SOF). A tunnel shaft discovered by the IDF led to a 100-meter-long tunnel containing a weapons production site where components of precision weapons were found, with images shared by the IDF of the site showing a rocket engine and a warhead designed for a Hamas cruise missile indicating Iranian involvement.

==== 10 January ====
Hamas denied it has lost command-and-control network in the Gaza Strip and published videos of al-Qassam Brigades operations in Northern Gaza including Sheikh Radwan but the videos were dated to late December 2023. Institute for the Study of War (ISW) claimed that Hamas command and control network had been dismantled but Hamas forces are in Gaza City were not yet defeated specially in the southern Gaza City where the Zaytoun Battalion had access to a rear safe haven in the Central Governorate. The ISW speculated that remaining Hamas forces in northern Gaza Strip were shifting their strategy to fix Israeli forces in the area to prevent the IDF forces from moving southwards.

==== 12 January ====
As the IDF discovered a PIJ underground tunnel network in Shuja'iyya neighborhood which the IDF had not previously noticed despite being one kilometer from the border with Israel. The IDF described the remaining Hamas fighters having gone into a "guerilla mode" after the deaths of most Hamas battalion commanders and disrupt IDF attempts to dismantle the remaining Hamas military infrastructure.

==== 16 January ====
According to the Institute for the Study of War, Palestinian militias were likely infiltrating areas which were previously cleared by the IDF. There is a similar but more limited renewal of Palestinian activity in other locations that Israeli forces previously conducted clearing operations around the northern Gaza Strip as well. According to Israel, Hamas was trying to restore its control over northern Gaza Strip by rehabilitating local police. As a result Israeli forces have "repositioned" themselves in Gaza City after they had withdrawn earlier.

==== 17 January ====
As Israeli forces repositioned themselves throughout the North Gaza axis, al-Qassam brigades claimed to have ambushed a group of soldiers in a Namer APC and killed several. The paramilitary group on later uploaded a video on their military broadcast of the attack, showing the Namer getting ambushed in a dual attack, first by a Shawadh IED detonation and secondly by an additional Yasin-105 rocket fired by an al-Qassam Brigade militants, killing 10 soldiers whose dog tags were shown at the end of the video.

==== 18 January ====
By 18 January, the IDF stated that Hamas had begun to rebuild its armies in the occupied parts of Northern Gaza. The IDF had previously stated these armies were stripped of military capabilities but by 18 January the fighting strength of many battalions had been significantly restored.

=== February 2024 ===
==== 10 February ====
The IDF announced a division sized clearing operation to deal with Hamas infiltrations into Northern Gaza saying that 120 Palestinian militant deaths and the discovery of an alleged Hamas "data center" underneath the headquarters of the UN Relief and Works Agency for Palestinian Refugees (UNRWA) in addition to weapons inside the headquarters. The tunnel displayed to journalists began at a UNRWA school and went under the UNRWA HQ with the IDF saying the tunnel received power from the UNRWA building. UNRWA head Philippe Lazzarini denied that the UNRWA was aware of the tunnel stating that it lacked the expertise and capability to inspect underneath the premises.

==== 29 February ====
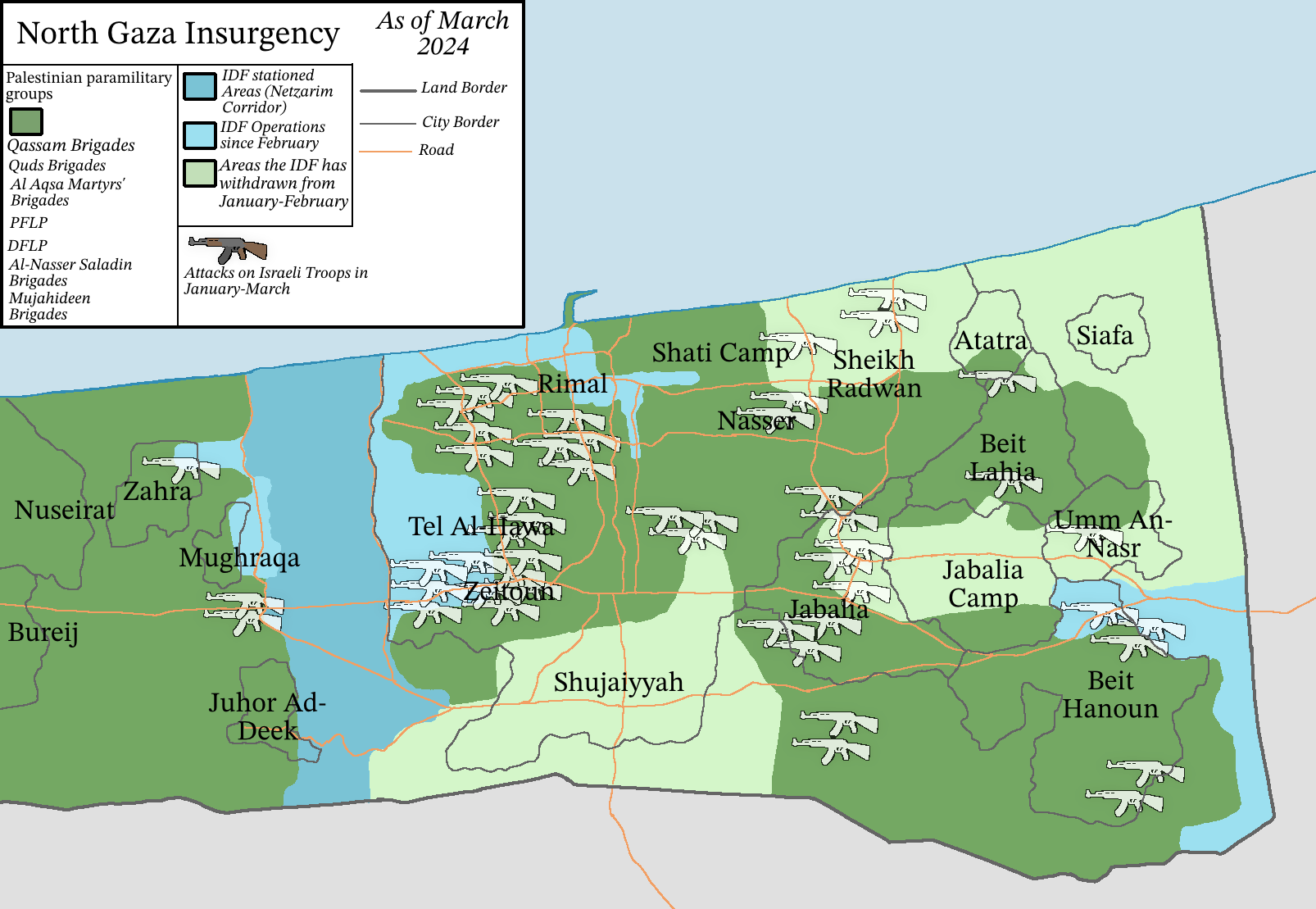
Reported military situation in Gaza in March

More than 100 Palestinians were killed and 750 were wounded after Israeli forces opened fire on Palestinians waiting for food aid southwest of Gaza City.

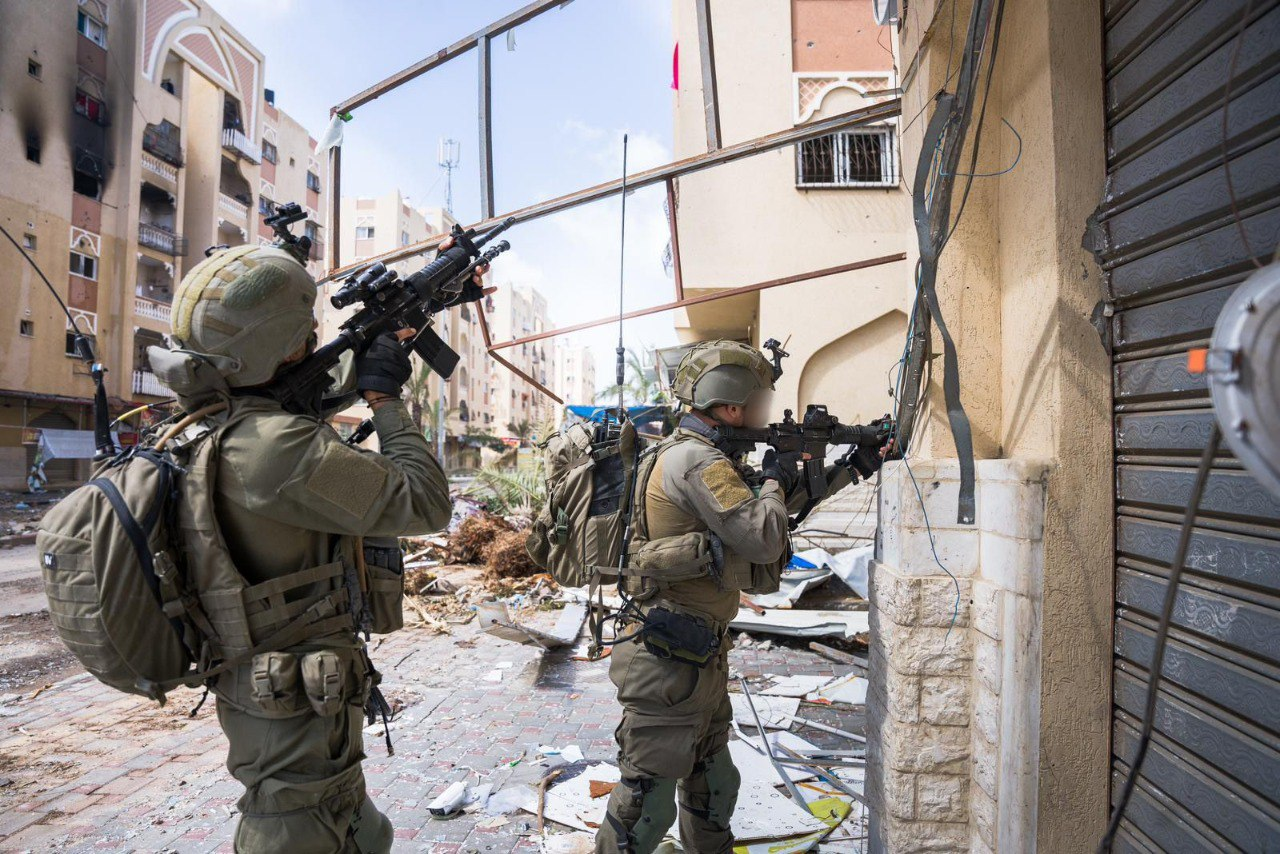
An IDF infantry team operating on a street next to a building, March 2024

=== May–June 2024 ===
==== 10 May ====
At least three people were killed and five more injured after the IAF bombed a house in the central part of Gaza City.

==== 14 May ====
Israel resumed attacks in Gaza city. Heavy clashes between Israeli forces and Hamas were reported in Gaza City, Jabalia, and Nuseirat, while fighting continued in and around Rafah, with Israeli ground forces advancing into the Brazil and Jneina neighborhoods.

==== 15 May ====
Israeli forces targeted a group of people in al-Jalaa Street and al-Oyoun Street in the center of Gaza city with a drone strike, at least three people were killed and more were injured. and an internet access point in Gaza City, killing at least four people and critically injured more.

==== 17 May ====
An Israeli aircraft bombed the al-Jaouni School housing displaced people in the Nuseirat refugee camp, killing four people.

==== 18 May ====
At least eight people, including women and children, were killed and 10 were wounded after Israeli shelling targeted a group of Palestinians filling water containers in the al-Faluja area of Gaza City. and two people were killed by an Israeli attack near Nuseirat camp, and two others were killed in an attack in Wadi Gaza.

==== 19 May ====
Six people were killed by Israeli bombing of a house in the Daraj neighbourhood, while three people were killed by Israeli bombing of a school in the same neighborhood.

==== 21 May ====
The al-Qassam Brigades claimed to have killed an unknown number of Israeli soldiers in the Tel al-Zaatar neighbourhood in northern Gaza City.

==== 22 May ====
An Israeli soldier of the Battalion 222 was injured in Northern Gaza. Israeli forces attacked the Zawaida neighborhood in central Gaza, killing at least 10 people, including women and children. An Israeli attack hit a house belonging to the Abu Zaida family in the Bir an-Naaja area in northern Gaza, killing at least six people.

==== 23 May ====
Israeli airstrikes reportedly killed ten people in Gaza City.

==== 24 May ====
The IAF attacked a house in the al-Fakhoura neighbourhood near the Jabalia refugee camp, killing at least five people. Another house was struck in the Sheikh Radwan neighbourhood, north of Gaza City, killing two people. At least 10 people were killed in the Shabiyah area of Gaza City after Israeli forces targeted an apartment complex.

==== 26 May ====
An Israeli reservist in Gaza called for a mutiny against the Israeli government but was dismissed by the IDF and later interrogated by Israel Police.

==== 27 May ====
The Israeli Air Force (IAF) bombed a house belonging to the bombed the home of the al-Batran family in the Zarqa area, north of Gaza City, killing five people including a pregnant mother and her child.

==== 15 June ====
At least 28 Palestinians were killed after the IAF attacked three houses in Gaza City.

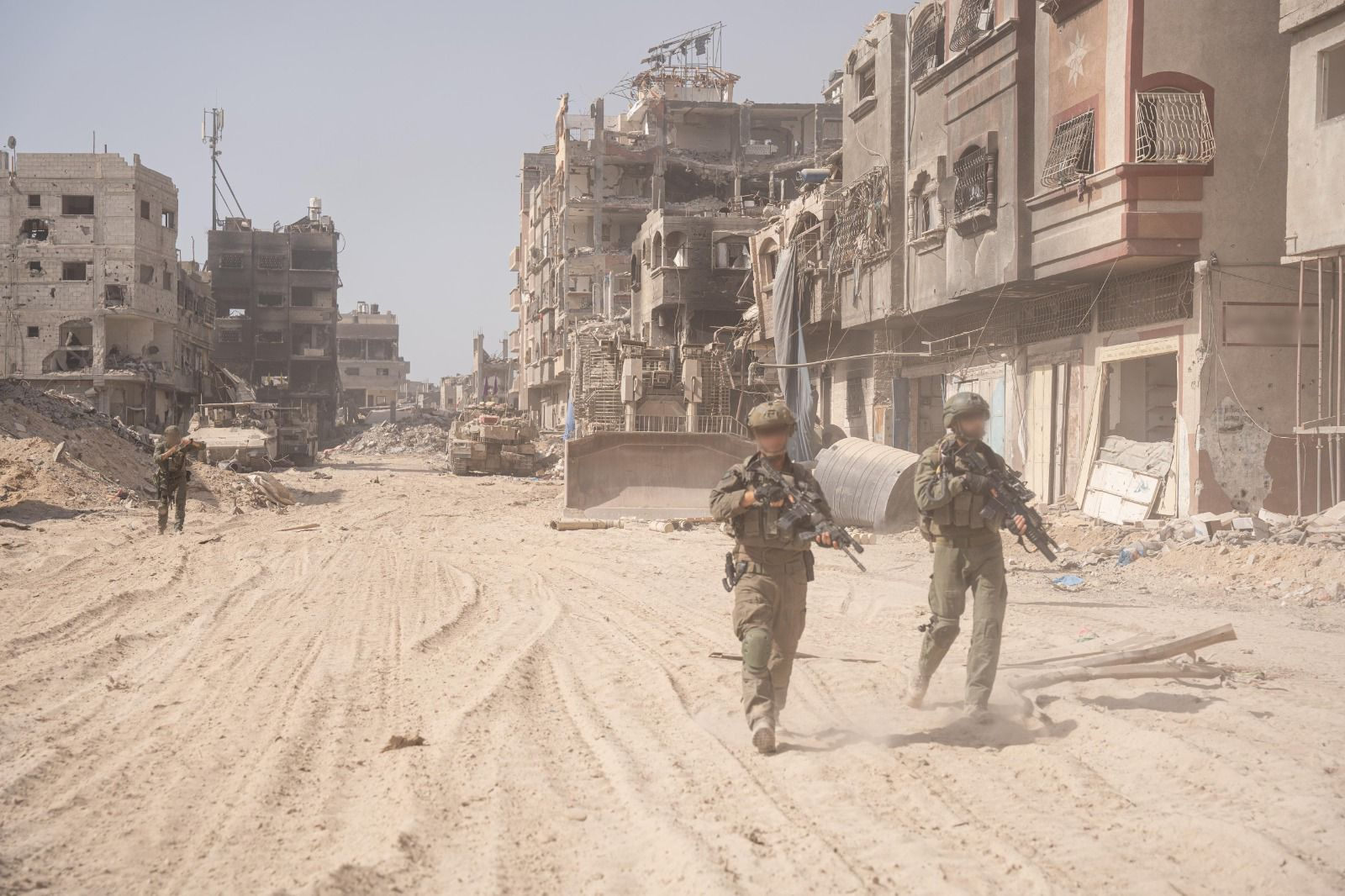
Israeli soldiers advancing through a street, October 2024

=== End of the siege ===
A ceasefire agreement between Israel and Hamas came into effect on 19 January 2025. That same day, the IDF withdrew from all of northern Gaza, and the first transfers of Israeli hostages from Hamas custody to the Red Cross occurred inside Gaza City amid large celebrating crowds of Palestinians. Hamas militants were seen deployed throughout the city, including for crowd control, likely in a show of force to demonstrate that Israel had failed to dismantle the militant group.

== Effects ==
With Gaza City isolated from the rest of the strip, the city was struck with a severe famine. This was deepened by the Israeli bombardment, which caused the deterioration of basic infrastructure and services. Airstrikes have destroyed food infrastructure, such as bakeries and flour mills, and there is a widespread scarcity of essential supplies due to the long-lasting blockade on Gaza. (Note: The Israeli NGO Btselem has stated the famine is a direct outcome of Israeli policy: "This reality is not a byproduct of war, but a direct result of Israel's declared policy. Residents now depend entirely on food supplies from outside Gaza, as they can no longer produce almost any food themselves. Most cultivated fields have been destroyed, and accessing open areas during the war is dangerous in any case. Bakeries, factories and food warehouses have been bombed or shut down due to lack of basic supplies, fuel and electricity.") This has caused starvation for more than half a million Gazans and is part of a broader humanitarian crisis, and in the north of the strip a third of children under two years old are suffering from acute malnutrition.

In February 2024, owing to the dwindling food supplies, Palestinian ranchers resorted to slaughtering horses in order to feed locals.

== Casualties ==
The Palestinian Civil Defence (PCD) has restricted access to North Gaza, cut off from the rest of the strip by the Netzarim Corridor and is unable to conduct large scale body retrieval operations. They estimate that 10,000 civilians lie under the rubble.

== Reactions ==
- Israel: Israeli Prime Minister Benjamin Netanyahu, who had previously rejected calls for a ceasefire, announced: "We are advancing [...] Nothing will stop us" and vowed to destroy Hamas rule in the Gaza Strip. Netanyahu had also suggested a plan for Israel to be responsible for Gaza's overall security for an "indefinite period" after the war.
- Hamas: Al-Qassam spokesman Abu Obeida said that Israel's death toll in Gaza was much higher than the military had announced, and stated "Your soldiers will return in black bags".
- Palestinian National Authority (PNA): President of the Palestinian National Authority (PNA) in the West Bank, Mahmoud Abbas, stated that Israel was violating international law. Abbas told U.S. Secretary of State Antony Blinken: "I have no words to describe the genocide and destruction suffered by our Palestinian people in Gaza at the hands of Israel's war machine, with no regard for the principles of international law".
- Hezbollah: Secretary-General of Hezbollah Hassan Nasrallah warned the United States in a speech that preventing a regional conflict depended on ending the Israeli bombardments of Gaza, and threatened that the clashes along the Israel–Lebanon border could escalate into a full-scale war. He also hinted that Hezbollah was ready to confront U.S. warships in the Eastern Mediterranean.
- United Nations (UN): High commissioner of the UN expressed concern that Israel's: "disproportionate attacks [...] could amount to war crimes". UN Human Rights Commissioner Volker Türk said that the Israeli sieges are illegal under international law.
- United States: U.S. President Joe Biden said "I think we need a pause" in a speech.
- Russia: Russian President Vladimir Putin criticized those who remain silent amid the escalating suffering and expressed that only individuals with a "heart of stone" could remain indifferent, particularly to the plight of the children in the region.
- United Arab Emirates (UAE): The UAE warned that there was a risk of a regional spillover from the war in Gaza. It claimed that it was working "relentlessly" to secure a humanitarian ceasefire.
- Saudi Arabia: The Kingdom of Saudi Arabia (KSA) announced a government campaign to collect humanitarian aid for Gaza, which gathered more than 60,000 donations worth $17 million in its first few hours. King Salman donated $8 million, while Crown Prince Mohammed bin Salman donated around $5.3 million. Saudi officials issued statements condemning the Israeli bombardment of Gaza, urgently pleading for a ceasefire and calling for the establishment of a Palestinian state.
- Oman: The Foreign Ministry of Oman demanded the establishment of an international court to investigate war crimes committed by Israel in Gaza. The ministry also called for "the prosecution of war criminals in all the massacres committed" and condemned the attacks on two schools sheltering civilians, the entrance of a hospital and a public water tank in the past 24 hours.
- Turkey: Turkish President Recep Tayyip Erdoğan said that he was breaking off contact with Benjamin Netanyahu due to Israel's actions in Gaza. Erdogan stated "Netanyahu is no longer someone we can talk to. We have written him off".
- Honduras: Honduran President Xiomara Castro recalled its ambassador due to "the grave humanitarian situation the Palestinian civilian population suffers in the Gaza Strip". The Israeli Foreign Ministry criticized this decision and said the move ignores Israel's right to defend itself against Hamas.
- Qatar: The Qatari Foreign Ministry strongly condemned the Israeli bombing of al-Fakhoora school and hospitals in Gaza.

== See also ==
- Outline of the Gaza war
- Gaza–Israel conflict
- List of sieges
- List of military engagements during the Gaza war
- Gaza humanitarian crisis
- Evacuation of the northern Gaza Strip
- Media coverage of the Israeli–Palestinian conflict
- Timeline of the Gaza war
  - Timeline of the Gaza war (28 October 2023 – 23 November 2023)
  - Timeline of the Gaza war (24 November 2023 – 11 January 2024)
  - Timeline of the Gaza war (12 January 2024 – 6 May 2024)
  - Timeline of the Gaza war (7 May 2024 – 12 July 2024)
  - Timeline of the Gaza war (13 July 2024 – 26 September 2024)
  - Timeline of the Gaza war (27 September 2024 – 16 October 2024)
  - Timeline of the Gaza war (17 October 2024 – 26 November 2024)
  - Timeline of the Gaza war (27 November 2024 – 18 January 2025)
  - Timeline of the Gaza war (19 January 2025 – 17 March 2025)
  - Timeline of the Gaza war (18 March 2025 – 15 May 2025)
  - Timeline of the Gaza war (16 May 2025 – 19 August 2025)
  - Timeline of the Gaza war (20 August 2025 – 2 October 2025)
  - Timeline of the Gaza war (3 October 2025 – present)
- Timeline of the Israeli–Palestinian conflict in 2023
- Timeline of the Israeli–Palestinian conflict in 2024
- Timeline of the Israeli–Palestinian conflict in 2025
