= Turukman =

Neighborhood in Gaza, Palestine

Turukman التركمان غزة
- Neighborhood
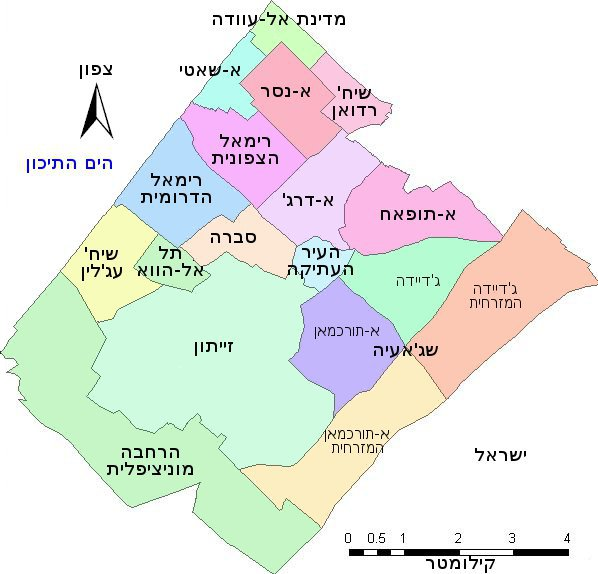
- Gaza quarters
- Interactive map of Turukman
- Region: Palestine
- Governorate: Gaza Governorate
- City: Gaza
- Time zone: UTC+2 (EET)
  - Summer (DST): +3

Turukman (Arabic: التركمان غزة) is a neighborhood in the eastern part of the Palestinian city of Gaza. It is named after a military unit composed of Turkmen from Palestine who settled here in several waves of immigration throughout the Muslim conquest of the Levant, and came to establish Gaza City as part of the Muslim hold in Palestine. The Shuja'iyya neighborhood, adjacent to it to the north, is known for being populated by residents of Turkmen origin and Kurds who settled in Palestine.
