= Mahkamah Mosque =

Destroyed mosque in Gaza City, Palestine

- Location of the former mosque in Gaza

Religion
- Affiliation: Islam (former)
- Ecclesiastical or organizational status: Friday mosque; Madrasa; (1455–2014)
- Status: Destroyed

Location
- Location: Baghdad Street, Shuja'iyya, Gaza Strip
- Country: Palestine
- Interactive map of Mahkamah Mosque
- Coordinates: 31°30′07″N 34°28′11″E

Architecture
- Style: Burji Mamluk
- Completed: 1455 CE
- Destroyed: July–August 2014 (2014 Gaza War)

Specifications
- Dome: Three (unknown)
- Minaret: 1
- Materials: Stone; marble

The Mahkamah Mosque, also known as the Mosque of Birdibak or the Madrasa of Amir Bardabak (Arabic transliteration: Jāmi' al-Mahkamah al-Birdibakiyyah) was a Friday mosque and madrasa, that was located along Baghdad Street near the main western entrance of the Shuja'iyya district in Gaza City, in the State of Palestine.

Completed in 1455 CE, the mosque was destroyed by Israeli bombing during the 2014 Gaza War.

== Etymology ==
The Arabic name al-Mahkamah means "the Court" (Sharia court). The name comes from the Ottoman period, when the school was used as a courthouse by Gaza's judges (qadis).

== History ==
The mosque was built in 1455 on the orders of Sayf al-Din Birdibak al-Ashrafi, the dawadar of the Mamluk sultan Sayf al-Din Inal. Birdibak was highly religious and convened an annual conference to discuss the hadith of the 9th-century Muslim scholar Muhammad al-Bukhari. He reached high positions within the Mamluk state and built two other Friday mosques in Damascus and Cairo. The Mahkamah Mosque was originally part of a madrasa ("religious school"), and education served as the building's principal function. Prayers were also held regularly and on Fridays.

During Ottoman rule between the 16th and early 20th centuries, the school functioned as a courthouse for the city's qadis, hence its Arabic name. In the late 19th-century, Swiss scholar Max van Berchem found a Kufic inscription fixed over the mihrab ("pulpit") of the mosque that belonged to the tombstone of Muhammad ibn al-Abbas al-Hashimi, a member of the Hashemite family who had died in Gaza in the late-9th century. On top of the mosque's entrance is the foundation inscription crediting Birdibak for the mosque's construction and honoring Sultan Inal.

During the British Mandate period following World War I it served as a boys' religious school under the name Madrasa al-Shuja‘iyya al-Amiriyya.

The mosque was destroyed by the Israeli airforce during the 2014 Gaza War.

== Architecture ==
The mosque was constructed in the Burji Mamluk style. It served as a unique example of Mamluk architecture, having been highly influenced by earlier Ayyubid mosque-madrasas. In particular, the niches of the northern façade strongly resembled the architectural elements of Ayyubid structures in Egypt and Syria. The complex consists of a central sahn situated 1.2 metres (3 ft 11 in) below street level. There are several ablution places in the courtyard area.

North of the courtyard is the façade where the main entrance is located. The entrance portal is topped by a pointed arch with floral decorations. The northern part of the mosque consists of the entrance hall and three other rectangular-shaped rooms each measuring 3.77 by 3.69 metres (12.4 by 12.1 ft). Each room, including the entrance hall, is topped by a small dome. The southern part of the complex was laid out in a similar manner, but is in ruins. The rooms on both sides of the mosque served as lodging for the sheikh and his students and provided other services as well. This particular layout makes the Mahkamah Mosque the only madrasa of its kind still standing in Gaza.

The courtyard was bordered to the southwest by the iwan. The iwan was divided into three sections and was the largest part of the mosque complex. The central portion served as the principal section and was covered by a fan-shaped cross vault. It contained the mihrab ("niche" that indicates the qibla which is the direction towards Mecca) and the minbar ("pulpit"). The minbar was adorned with marble paneling, floral motifs and Qur'anic inscriptions. The main section was bordered by two smaller outer sections with barrel vaulting and pointed arches connecting both structures with the main section. In the northwest, a smaller Mamluk-era iwan that previously faced the main iwan is extant. The western façade is mostly in ruins as well.

In the northwestern corner of the mosque is the Mamluk-style minaret. The base of the minaret is rectangular, while the shaft is composed of two octagonal stories topped by the octagonal muezzin's gallery. The sides of the base contain niches that "alleviate the austerity of the structure" according to Islamic art researcher Mu'en Sadeq. The octagonal levels of the minaret's body are designed with embrasures decorated with translucent floral and geometric ornamentation. The embrasures allow light and ventilation into the interior spiral staircase that leads to the muezzin's gallery which rests on stone muqarnas.

== See also ==
- List of mosques in Palestine
- Islam in Palestine
