= 2024 Shuja'iyya incursion =

Battle in the Israel-Hamas War

Battle of Shuja'iyya (2024)
- Part of the siege of Gaza City during the Gaza war
Date	27 June – 10 July 2024 (1 week and 5 days)
Location	Shuja'iyya, Gaza City, Palestine
Territorial changes	Hamas and Palestinian Islamic Jihad retain presence in Shuja'iyya after Israeli withdrawal

Belligerents
Israel	(Palestine) Palestinian Joint Operations Room; Hamas; Palestinian Islamic Jihad

Commanders and leaders
(Israel) Roy Miller †	(Hamas) Ayman Showadeh †

Units involved
Israel Defense Forces; Israeli Ground Forces; Israeli Air Force	(Palestine) Palestinian Joint Operations Room; (Hamas) Al Qassam Brigades; Gaza Brigade; Shuja'iyya Battalion\; (Palestinian Islamic Jihad) Al-Quds Brigades; Gaza Brigade; Shuja'iyya Battalion; Turukman Battalion

Casualties and losses
Per Israel: 5 soldiers killed Per Hamas: 4+ soldiers killed Several APCs destroyed	Per Israel: (Palestine) 150 fighters killed
- At least 3 medics killed and 12 wounded 80,000 displaced

Israeli forces raided the Shuja'iyya district of Gaza City for the second time from 27 June to 10 July 2024 as part of the Gaza war.

== Background ==
The Israel Defense Forces (IDF) had begun an ongoing general siege of Gaza City on 2 November 2023 as part of the Israeli invasion of the Gaza Strip, itself a response to the October 2023 Hamas-led attack on southern Israel which began the war. The first battle at Shuja'iyya began on 4 December 2023 and ended on 26 December 2023 with the IDF withdrawing after facing fierce Palestinian resistance and failing to push out Hamas from the area.

Israel claimed that it had dismantled Hamas in the region in December, but militants continued to attack Israeli forces and maintained a strong presence in the area. This resulted in Israel attacking Shuja'iyya once again in late June.

== Battle ==
The IDF began a second invasion of Shuja'iyya on 27 June 2024 with a combined tank and drone assault, ordering Palestinian civilians to go south. These operations were led by the 98th Paratroopers Division with medics and witnesses saying the assault had caused numerous casualties. Israeli bombing of the neighbourhood resulted in widespread destruction, causing tens of thousands of Palestinians to flee the attack, while the UN estimated that up to 80,000 Palestinians were displaced from the area.

Hamas and its ally Palestinian Islamic Jihad responded to the invasion with guerilla attacks, artillery fire, and sniper attacks on IDF positions. On 4 July, in operations conducted by Palestinian militants in the city, an Israeli officer was killed while three others were seriously injured.

On 12 July, it was reported that the IDF had managed to kill the deputy head of the Hamas battalion in Shuja'iyya, Ayman Showadeh, who was involved in leading the October 2023 attack on Israel.

The Israeli army stated that it had destroyed 8 tunnels during the battle, and on 10 July, Israel retreated from the neighbourhood, while Palestinian militants retained their positions.

== Aftermath ==
Families among the tens of thousands displaced by Israeli actions in Shuja'iyya began to return following the end of the battle but reported widespread destruction and that nearly every building in the neighbourhood had been destroyed. Gazan officials working for the native government in Gaza returned to the neighbourhood immediately following the Israeli withdrawal and found more than 60 bodies. It was reported that the neighborhood had "become a disaster area that is not suitable for habitat", with 85% of the residential buildings there destroyed by the IDF.

One family reported that the IDF had raided their Shuja'iyya home on July 3 and attacked their family member, Muhammed Bhar, with a combat dog. According to the family, the IDF promised to treat Bhar, who had Down Syndrome, and ordered the rest of the family to leave at gunpoint. After the IDF withdrawal, the family said that they returned to find Bhar dead on the floor.

== See also ==
- 2025 Shuja'iyya offensive, third invasion of the neighborhood by Israel during the war
