= Battle of Shuja'iyya (2023) =

Battle in the Gaza war

- Part of the siege of Gaza City during the Gaza war
Date	4–26 December 2023 (3 weeks and 1 day)
Location	Shuja'iyya, Gaza City, Palestine
Result	Israeli withdrawal
Territorial changes	Israeli withdrawal from Shuja'iyya; Palestinian fighters regain control of Shuja'iyya

Belligerents
Israel	Palestinian Joint Operations Room; Hamas; Palestinian Islamic Jihad; Popular Front for the Liberation of Palestine

Commanders and leaders
(Israel) Yaron Finkelman (Israel) Dado Bar Kalifa (Israel) Barak Hiram (Israel) Avi Rosenfeld (Israel) Yair Palai (Israel) Moran Omer (Israel) Ami Biton (Israel) Yaniv Barot (Israel) Tomer Greenberg †	(Hamas) Emad Abdullah Ali Qariqa X (Hamas) Wissam Farhat X

Units involved
Israel Defense Forces; Israeli Ground Forces; 36th Division; Golani Brigade; 188th Armored Brigade; 35th Paratroopers Brigade; 99th Infantry Division; Kfir Brigade; 646th Brigade; Yiftach Brigade; 252nd Division; 14th Brigade; Gaza Division; Bislamach Brigade; Yahalom; Israeli Air Force; Unit 669	(Palestine) Palestinian Joint Operations Room; (Hamas) Al-Qassam Brigades; Gaza Brigade; Shuja'iyya Battalion; (Palestinian Islamic Jihad) Al-Quds Brigades; Gaza Brigade; Shuja'iyya Battalion; Turukman Battalion; (Popular Front for the Liberation of Palestine) Abu Ali Mustafa Brigades

Casualties and losses
(Israel) 16 soldiers killed (Israel) 1 Namer destroyed	Per Israel: (Palestine) 935+ fighters killed
- (Israel) 3 Israeli prisoners killed

The Battle of Shuja'iyya was a military engagement between Israel and Hamas-led Palestinian forces in December 2023 during the Gaza war.

During the Israeli invasion of the Gaza Strip, Shuja'iyya was the last district in Gaza City that had not been subject to an Israeli ground invasion, and as a result many Palestinians who had not been able to evacuate south had sought refuge in the district. Despite this, the Israel Defense Forces had shelled and bombarded targets in Shuja'iyya for weeks before invading on December 4. On the 26th of December, Israel withdrew from Shuja'iyya, announcing that the local Hamas battalion had been defeated. Despite this, militants continued to attack Israeli forces within the town.

== Background ==
Shuja'iyya is one of the largest and most densely populated neighborhoods in Gaza, holding 92,000 people. As a result of Israeli forces invading southern Gaza City, many Palestinians had sought refuge in the neighbourhood, causing rising concerns of civilian casualties if Israel were to expand its invasion into the area.

== Battle ==
On December 4, Israel launched an invasion of Shuja'iyya, advancing from the southern Gaza city after subjecting it to a massive bombardment campaign leaving most of the district in ruins.

Palestinian militant groups led by the Izz ad-Din al-Qassam Brigades confronted Israeli forces on the 6th of December. The paramilitaries took advantage of the environment created by Israeli bombardment and relied on dense buildings to weave throughout the district instead of relying on tunnels, setting the stage for a major urban battle.

During early confrontations, the Qassam Brigades attacked vehicles penetrating into Shuja'iyya, armed with AK-47 and Al-Yassin 105 tandem charge rockets. The packed buildings and tight streets allowed the brigades to approach vehicles at very close distances and fire in rapid succession before hopping between buildings for cover. Infamously, after an Achzarit was destroyed and ignited, a militant stood in front of it and took a selfie.

As Israeli forces pushed into the district, reconnaissance published footage of Qassam Brigades militants using buildings as hideouts, including crawling on the floors to avoid detection.

Qassam Brigades utilised dense urban landscape, allowing them in some instances to approach tanks and fire at them from mere metres away, as well as pelting Israeli forces with grenades thrown out of windows.

On December 13, the Qassam Brigades lured four soldiers into a coordinated ambush, and then launched successive attacks on Israeli forces sent to rescue those wounded, including collapsing the rigged building on top of them. The IDF admitted that 10 soldiers had been killed in the ambush, including two high-ranking officers.

By December 21, Israeli forces claimed they had “operational control” of Shuja'iyya.

Palestinian Islamic Jihad militants of the Al-Quds Brigades set up sniper posts on high-rise structures, jumping between the windows of multi-story high buildings to navigate positions throughout the district. The Qassam Brigades located several Israeli soldiers positioned in buildings and outposts and harassed them, eroding morale and security.

On December 26, Israeli forces had retreated from Shuja'iyya, following an incomplete operation that allowed the Palestinian militants to retain control of the town and launch attacks on Israeli soldiers from the area.

== Aftermath ==
The Euro-Mediterranean Human Rights Monitor assumes that Palestinian civilians were killed in the battle due to the extent of destruction and no retrieval of bodies.

Additionally, three Israeli hostages were mistakenly killed by the Israeli Defense Forces while holding a white cloth.

Following the withdrawal of Israeli forces, much of the district lay under rubble and basic infrastructure had been destroyed by Israeli bombardment.

Israeli forces invaded Shuja'iyya again in June 2024, leading to a second battle which also ended in an Israeli withdrawal.
