= 36th Division (Israel) =

Unit of the Israel Defense Forces

36th Division "Ga'ash"
- עוצבת סיני
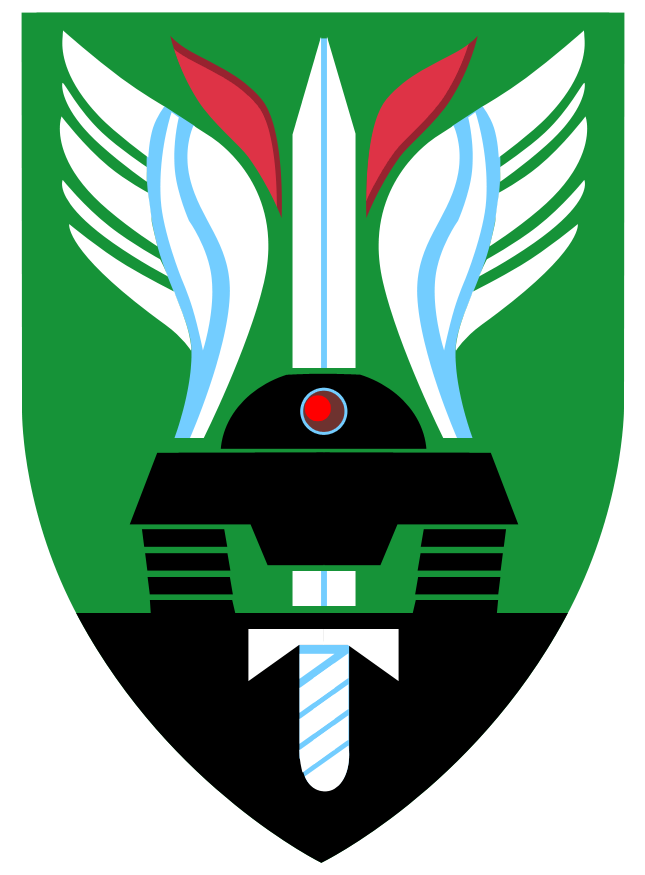
- 36th Division insignia
- Founded: 1954–present
- Country: Israel
- Branch: Israeli Ground Forces
- Type: Armoured Division
- Size: Division
- Part of: Southern Command
- Garrison/HQ: Tavor Camp
- Engagements: Six Days War; Yom Kippur War; 1982 Lebanon War; 2014 Gaza War; 2006 Lebanon War; Gaza war; Battle of Shuja'iyya; Israel–Hezbollah conflict

Commanders
- Current commander: Tat Aluf Moran Omer

The 36th Division "Ga'ash", also known as the Ga'ash Formation ("Rage"), is a regular-service division of the Israel Defense Forces (IDF). It is subordinate to Northern Command.

== History ==
The division was established in September 1954. Until 1958 it was led by Aluf Avraham Yoffe. At the time, divisional commands were mission-based commands without organic forces, but rather with troops apportioned according to given missions. It was led by Aluf Zvi Zamir from 1958 until he was succeeded by Aluf Uzi Narkiss in 1962, who led until 1965. From 1965 to 1969, it was led by Aluf Elad Peled.

During the 1967 Six-Day War, the division led the battles in the northern West Bank, commanding the Barak Armored Brigade (then the 45th Armored Brigade), the 37th Brigade and forces from the 1st Brigade. Later, it oversaw the occupation of the southern Golan Heights. After the war, from 1969 to 1972, the division was led by Aluf Shmuel Gonen (Gorodish). From 1972 to 1974, it was led by then-Aluf Rafael Eitan.

During the Yom Kippur War of October 1973, the division fought in the defensive battles over the northern Golan, and afterwards broke deeper into Syrian territory. During Operation Litani, Israel's invasion of Lebanon in 1978, the division fought on the eastern front. During the 1982 Lebanon War, it fought on the central front, proceeding along the coastal route to Beirut.

== Division organization ==
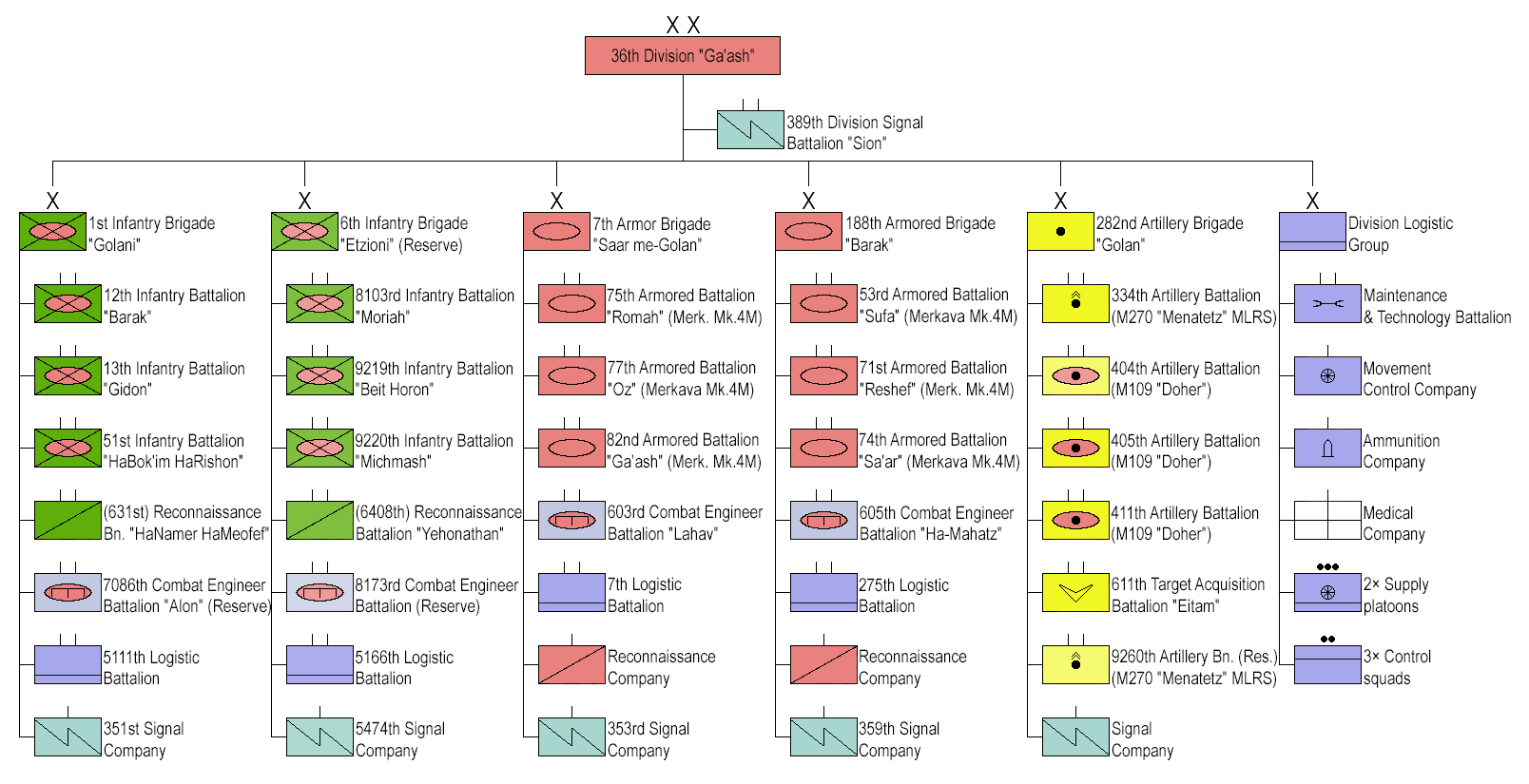
36th Division "Ga'ash" organization as of November 2026

- 36th Division "Ga'ash" ("Rage")
  - 1st Infantry Brigade "Golani"
    - 11th Reconnaissance-Strike Battalion "Alon" (activated October 2026)
    - 12th Infantry Battalion "Barak"
    - 13th Infantry Battalion "Gideon"
    - 51st Infantry Battalion "HaBok'im HaRishon" ("First Breachers")
    - (631st) Reconnaissance Battalion "Golani"
    - 7086th Combat Engineering Battalion "Alon" (Reserve)
    - 5111st Logistic Battalion (Reserve)
    - 351st Signal Company
  - 6th Infantry Brigade "Etzioni" (Reserve)
    - 8103rd Infantry Battalion "Moriah"
    - 9219th Infantry Battalion "Beit Horon"
    - 9220th Infantry Battalion "Machmash"
    - (6408th) Reconnaissance Battalion "Yehonathan"
    - 8173rd Combat Engineering Battalion
    - 5166th Logistic Battalion
    - 5474th Signal Company
  - 7th Armored Brigade "Saar me-Golan" ("Storm from Golan")
    - 75th Armored Battalion "Romah"
    - 77th Armored Battalion "Oz"
    - 82nd Armored Battalion "Ga'ash"
    - 603rd Combat Engineering Battalion "Lahav" ("Blade")
    - 7th Logistic Battalion
    - Reconnaissance Company
    - 353rd Signal Company
  - 188th Armored Brigade "Barak" ("Lightning")
    - 53rd Armored Battalion "Sufa"
    - 71st Armored Battalion "Reshef"
    - 74th Armored Battalion "Sa'ar"
    - 605th Combat Engineering Battalion "HaMahatz"
    - 275th Logistic Battalion
    - Reconnaissance Company
    - 359th Signal Company
  - 500th Armored Brigade (Reserve; reactivated 2026)
    - 195th Armored Battalion (reactivated 2026; full operational capability 2027)
    - 430th Armored Battalion (reactivated 2026; full operational capability 2027)
    - 433rd Armored Battalion (reactivated 2026; full operational capability 2027)
  - 282nd Artillery Brigade "Golan"
    - 334th Artillery Battalion "Ra’am/Thunder" (M270 "Menatetz" MLRS)
    - 404th Artillery Battalion "Shafifon/Viper" (Reserve) (M109 "Doher" self-propelled howitzers)
    - 405th Artillery Battalion "Namer/Leopard" (Ro'em wheeled 10×10 self-propelled howitzers)
    - 411th Artillery Battalion "Keren/Ray" (M109 "Doher" self-propelled howitzers)
    - 611th Target Acquisition Battalion "Eitam/Eagle"
    - 9260th Artillery Battalion "Magan" (Reserve) (M270 "Menatetz" MLRS)
    - Signal Company
  - Division Logistic Group
    - Maintenance & Technology Battalion
      - Maintenance Company A
      - Maintenance Company B
      - Assistance Company
    - Movement Control Company
    - Ammunition Company
    - Medical Company
    - 2× Supply platoons
    - 3× Control squads
  - 389th Division Signal Battalion "Sion"
