= Sparta Speech =

2025 speech by Benjamin Netanyahu

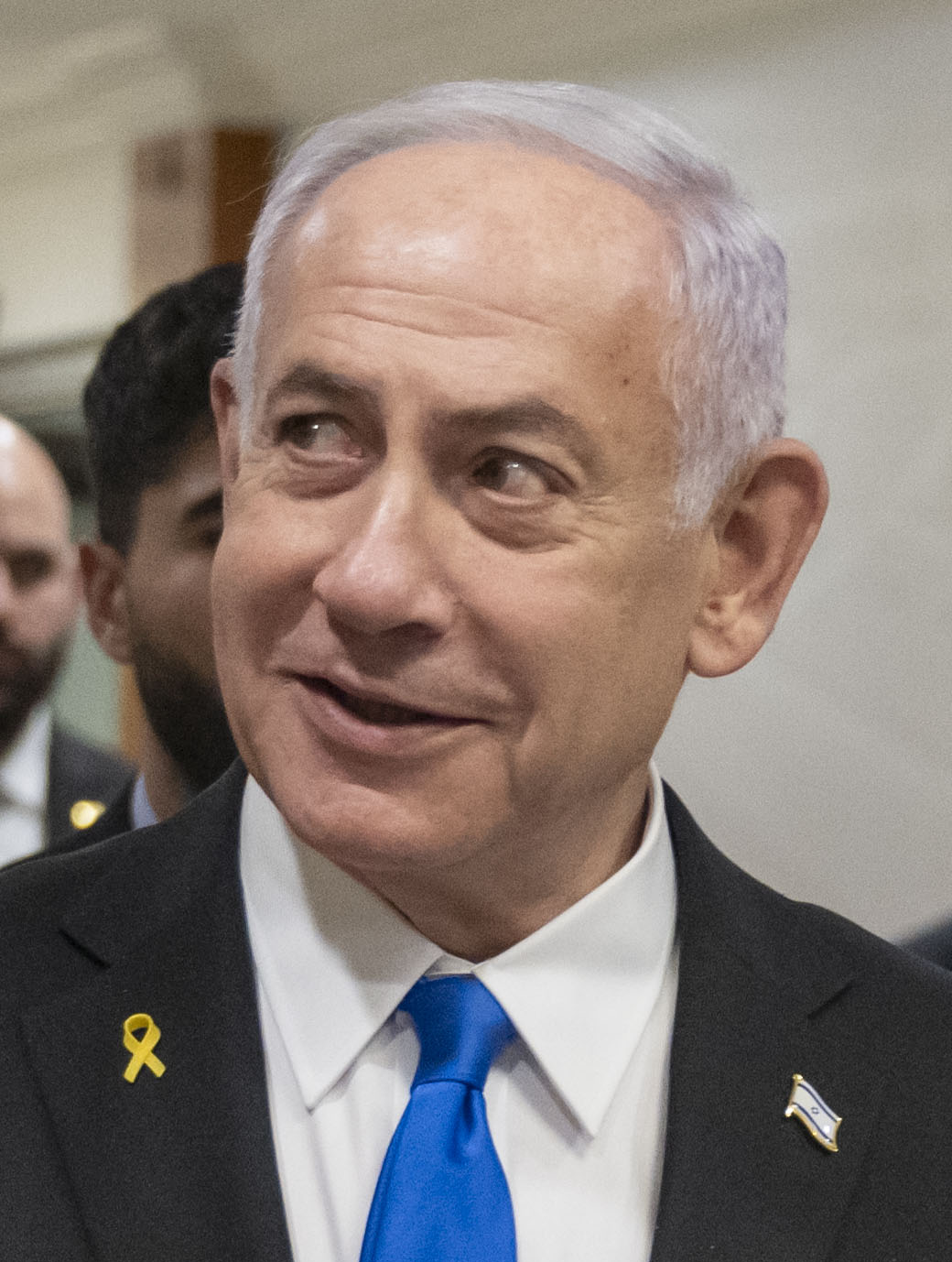
- Israeli Prime Minister Benjamin Netanyahu at the Pentagon, Washington, D.C., 2025
- Native name: נאום ספרטה
- Date: 15 September 2025
- Time: 3 PM (UTC+02:00)
- Location: International Convention Center Jerusalem, Israel

On 15 September 2025, Israeli prime minister Benjamin Netanyahu addressed a conference of the Accountant General in Jerusalem. His speech at the conference, referred to in Israeli media as the Sparta Speech (Hebrew: נאום ספרטה, romanized: Ne'um Sparta), described what he deemed Israel's growing diplomatic and economic isolation during the Gaza war, and called for the country to adopt a "Super-Sparta" approach to confront the resulting security and economic challenges. The speech sparked widespread debate and controversy in Israel.

== Background and content ==
Netanyahu outlined several factors which he claimed were contributing to Israel's escalating diplomatic isolation. Among his claims are the alleged political influence of Muslim immigrant communities in Europe, which he said pressured their governments to adopt critical stances toward Israel related to the Gaza war. Netanyahu also emphasized the role of digital technologies, including artificial intelligence, being exploited by states such as Qatar and China to conduct influence operations on social media, which he described as creating a "media siege" on Israel. He warned of potential trade restrictions as a consequence of diplomatic pressures, which could limit Israel's access to weapon components. He stressed the importance of expanding domestic arms production to maintain national security. Concluding his address, Netanyahu urged the development of a "Super-Sparta economy", which he defined as an economic model characterized by increased autarky. Although he identified himself as a supporter of free market principles, Netanyahu argued that the current geopolitical circumstances necessitated greater economic independence.

== Reactions ==
The speech prompted a range of responses within Israel. Following Netanyahu's remarks, the Tel Aviv Stock Exchange experienced declines. Political criticism was voiced by several prominent figures:

- Opposition leader Yair Lapid described the concept of an autarkic economy as unrealistic, arguing that Israel's isolation was the result of government policy failures rather than inevitability.
- Ram Ben Barak compared Netanyahu's proposal to the economic model of North Korea.
- Meirav Ben Ari criticized the government for endangering the country's future.
- Yair Golan, chairman of the Labor Party, suggested that the policies served the Prime Minister's personal political interests.
- Gadi Eisenkot of the National Unity Party warned of long-term damage from isolation and urged Netanyahu to resign if unable to resolve the crisis.
- Journalist Ben Caspit described the speech as an "alibi" for Netanyahu, whom Caspit accused of seeking the destruction of Israel as an act of revenge for his trial. Caspit compared it to the character Michael Kohlhaas, who destroyed Saxony in retaliation for the confiscation of his horses by a Saxon noble.

Beyond politics, senior executives from Israel's high-tech industry cautioned that the sector depended heavily on global markets and investor confidence. They warned that reduced international integration could undermine Israel's economic resilience and security advantages.

A day after the speech, Netanyahu convened a press conference, claiming that his remarks in the speech had been taken out of context, and that the Israeli economy is "very strong, amazes the entire world, and contrary to all forecasts, the shekel is stronger than it was before the war".

== See also ==
- Athens
- International isolation
