= Ibn Marwan Mosque =

Mosque in Gaza City, Palestine

- جامع ابن مروان
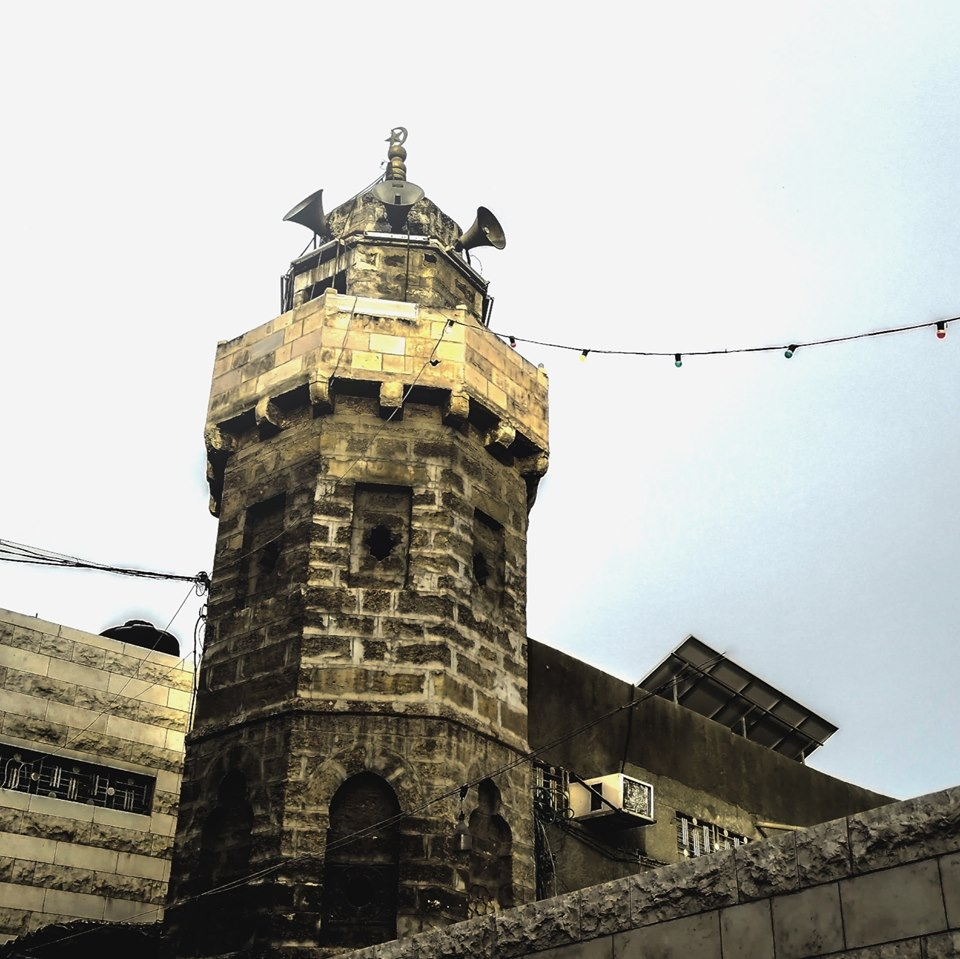
- The mosque in 2019

- Location within Gaza

Religion
- Affiliation: Islam
- Ecclesiastical or organisational status: Mosque
- Status: Possibly closed

Location
- Location: Tuffah, Gaza, Gaza Strip
- Country: Palestine
- Interactive map of Ibn Marwan Mosque
- Coordinates: 31°30′15″N 34°28′08″E

Architecture
- Style: Mamluk
- Completed: By the 14th Century CE
- Minaret: 1

The Ibn Marwan Mosque (Arabic: جامع ابن مروان, romanized: Jami' Ibn Marwan) is a mosque situated in the midst of a cemetery in the Tuffah neighborhood of Gaza, in the State of Palestine, relatively isolated from the rest of the city.

The year of construction for this mosque is unknown but it existed in the early 14th century CE (8th century Hijri).

== Names ==
The Ibn Marwan mosque is known by a variety of names, including Masjid Ali ibn Marwan, Jami Ali ibn Marwan, Sheikh Ibn Marwan, Ali Marwana, Ibn Marwana and Ali Marwan.

== History ==
The year of construction for this mosque is unknown but it existed in the early 14th century CE (8th century Hijri). The mosque is named after Sheikh Ali ibn Marwan who belonged to the Hasani family. The Hasani family came from the Maghreb and settled in Gaza where Ibn Marwan died on 26 Dhu al-Qa'dah 715 Hijri (22 February 1316 CE). Ibn Marwan was considered a saint during his lifetime by the people of Gaza and his tomb became a site of ziyarah after his death. The mosque sits in the north east corner of the cemetery where Ibn Marwan was buried.

The mosque contain various historical inscriptions, which were photographed by Max van Berchem and his colleagues and then later studied by Moshe Sharon in Corpus Inscriptionum Arabicarum Palaestinae. There are two inscriptions above the gate of the minaret detailing a renovation that took place in 725 Hijri (1325 CE), under the supervision of a Muhammad bin Baktamur, who was potentially the governor of Gaza with the same name according to historian Moshe Sharon. Baktamur, the governor of Gaza became mayor on 5 Muharram 710 Hijri (4 June 1310) and then further promoted to the great Hajib of Damascus in 711 Hijri (1311). He was arrested in the year 715 Hijri (1315) and then in 723 Hirji (1325 CE) he went on to become governor of Alexandria before dying in 724 Hirji (1324 CE). In these renovations the iwans of the prayer hall were expanded, the minaret was renovated and six shop were constructed. The revenue from said shops was used to fund the upkeep the nearby mausoleum of Ibn Marwan, located in the graveyard adjacent to the mosque, and pay the salary of the muezzin and the imam.

There was a subsequent renovation which took place in 730 Hijri (1329 CE) under the effort of Sayf ad-Din Tankiz, the governor general (kāfil al-mamāmik al-shāmīyah) of the province of Damascus, which is commemorated in an inscription kept in the storeroom of the Great Mosque of Gaza and was found during reconstruction work during the 1920s. Tankiz was nominated the governor general of Damascus in 712 Hijri (1312 CE) and retained his position until he was arrested and executed in 740 Hijri (1340 CE). Tankiz held the title of Emir and was a close friend of the Sultan, an-Nasir Muhammad, and connected to him through family. Two of Tankiz's sons married two of the Sultans daughters. In 720 Hijri (1320 CE) when Tankiz and Sanjar al-Jawli, the governor of Gaza, had an open dispute, the Sultan arrested Sanjar and supported Tankiz. Finally, in 740 Hijri (1340 CE), Tankiz fell out of favour with the Sultan when he was accused of conspiring against him and was put to death.

In 1217 Hijri (1802 CE) further renovations were undertaken by Amir Yahya, the governor of Gaza; a door was opened up on the west wall of the prayer hall. There is an inscription above the entrance to the Ibn Marwan mosque dated 10 Sha'ban 1217 Hijri (6 December 1802). It contains a poem in al-kamil metre. A translation of the inscription by Moshe Sharon is as follows:

Arabic Original	English Translation
رحب لضاق الكون بالاكوان هي منه في جنة الرحمن امير غزة هاشم الجزران جزاه خيرًا خالق الانسان ببناء مسجد علي بن مروان وبالخليل مبرد النيران والآل والاصحاب والاقران من منزل الزبور والفرقان ١) لولا المـحـبَّة في القلوب وانـــها ٢) هي سرُّ فرقان الاله وجمعه ٣) بجود وحلم ساد يحيى على الملا ٤) بنا بناء خالصًا في صنعه ٥) يحيى حباه الله كل فضيلة ٦) حصَّنته بالهاشمي محمد ٧) صلى الاله عليه بعد نبينا ٨) ما دام خير الدين يرجو رحمة ٩) حبر وحرر في عشرة من شعبان المبارك سنة ١٢١٧ هـ	Were it not for the love in the hearts, and their Vastness, the world would have been too narrow for the beings. It is the secret of God's dividing and joining; It is a benevolent gift in the Paradise of the All Compassionate. With generosity and gentleness, Yahya ruled the people; The Amir of Gaza, the city of Hashim who chopped slaughtered camels. He built a perfectly designed building; May the Creator of man reward him. Yahya, let Allah grant him every merit, For building Ali Ibn Marwan's Mosque. I strengthened him through Muhammad the Hashimite, And through the Friend (Abraham, "al-Khalil") who cooled the fires. May God bless him, after (blessing) our Prophet, And (his) family, friends and peers; As long as Khayr ad-Din asks for mercy From Him who revealed the Zabur and the Furqan. Composed and penned on the tenth of the blessed Sha'ban the year 1217H.

This poem refers to Gaza as "the city of Hashim", referencing Hashim ibn Abd Manaf, the great grandfather of the Islamic prophet Muhammad. Gaza is given this name because, according to tradition, Hashim ibn Abd Manaf died there on one of his trade voyages. Hashim, a member of the Quraysh tribe instituted caravans which made yearly journeys to Yemen and Abyssinia in the winter and Greater Syria in the summer. According to story, Hashim's original name was Amr, but he was given the nickname Hashim due to his generosity. The poem makes reference to the story of Hashims "generosity" during when the Meccans were suffering from hunger. The story goes that Hashim brought a large quantity of bread from Syria with his caravan and ordered for his camels to be killed to prepare tharid. Hashim broke bread up into this dish and from the arabic word هشم (hashama), meaning to break, he got his name, هاشم (hashim), meaning the breaker. This poem makes reference to the "chopped slaughtered camels" comparing the generosity of the Amir of Gaza, Yahya, with Hashim.

The mosque was previously open to visitors. As of February 2026, UNESCO confirmed that the mosque was one of more than 150 cultural properties with damage, assessed on satellite imagery, as a result of Israeli bombing of the Gaza Strip.

== Design ==
Ali ibn Marwan is buried inside a mausoleum in the cemetery beside the mosque. The mausoleum sits 10 meters to the south of the mosque and consists of a square chamber with a domed roof. The lintel of the doorway to the mausoleum has an inscription on marble in Turkish naskhi Mamluk style dated 1218 Hijri (1803-4 CE). There is no gravestone for ibn Marwan. The square room contains circular triangles on its corners, giving it a circular appearance.

The prayer hall of the mosque is 200 square meters and is divided into three isles by marble columns with re-used corinthian capitals. The aisles are split into nine vaults, each covered by shallow domes. There is a marble minbar, to the right of the mihrab. The minbar was built by Amir Shamsi Safar, chamberlain of the mosque in the 8th century Hijri (14th century CE). The dome of the mosque is decorated in geometrical and vegetal ornaments. It has one minaret which was renovated in 772 Hijri (1370-71 CE) and stands, on a square base, 11.6 meters tall to the south of the mosque. The sahn (courtyard) had a wooden barrier to create a prayer space for women.

== See also ==
- List of mosques in Palestine
- Islam in Palestine
- Destruction of cultural heritage during the Gaza war
- List of archaeological sites in the Gaza Strip
