= Shuja'iyya =

Coordinates: 31°30′02″N 34°28′12″E

Shuja'iyya الشجاعية
- Neighborhood
- Shuja'ia
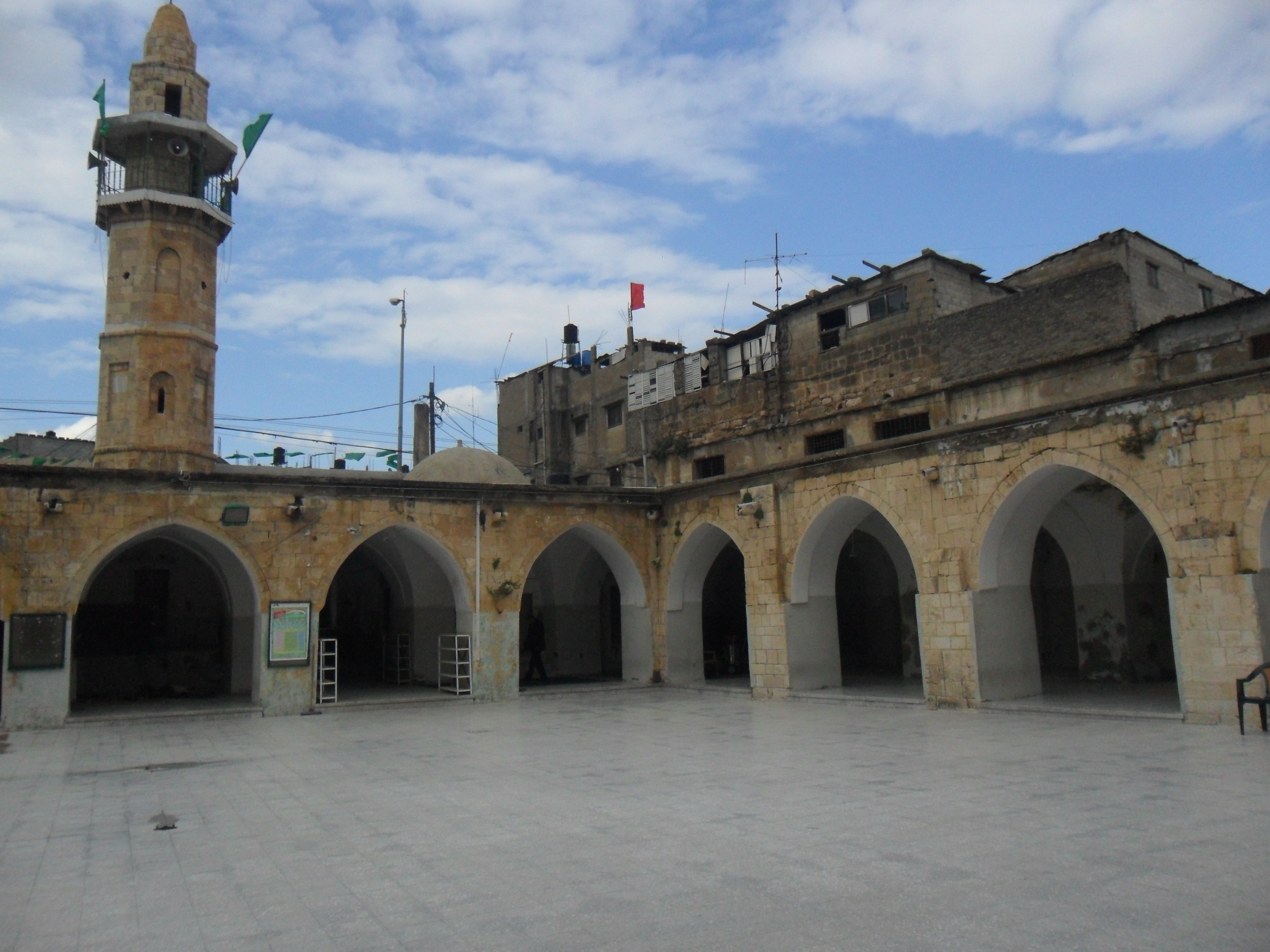
- The Ibn Uthman Mosque in 2017
- Interactive map of Shuja'iyya
- Location in Gaza Strip
- Country: Palestine
- Governorate: Gaza Governorate
- City: Gaza

Government
- Time zone: UTC+2 (EET)
  - Summer (DST): +3

Shuja'iyya (Arabic: الشجاعية), also Shejaiya, Shijaiyeh, Shujayya, Shuja'ia, Shuja'iya, is the southern quarter of Old City of Gaza, and the only quarter of the Old City located outside the historical city walls. It is one of the largest neighborhoods in Gaza, holding an estimated 92,000 residents in 2015, and over 115,000 by 2020. It is located east of Gaza's city center, and its nucleus is situated on a hill located across the main Salah al-Din Road that runs north–south throughout the Gaza Strip. Shuja-iyya is divided into four residential neighborhoods: Turukman, Al-Jadida, East Turukman, and East al-Jadida, which some divide it as two areas. Shuja'iyya contains several ancient structures, mosques and tombs, with the Commonwealth War Cemetery locating 2 kilometres (1.2 mi) north of the commercial center of the neighborhood.

== History ==
Shuja'iyya dates from the Ayyubid period in Gaza, and is named after Shuja' al-Din Uthman al-Kurdi, an Ayyubid emir ("commander") who died fighting against the Crusaders in 1239. The district is the first extension of Gaza beyond its city walls, and was a mixed quarter, as opposed to other quarters of Gaza. It was generally a commercial district, but also partially residential. During the Middle Ages, the neighborhood's houses were poorly built and its roads were narrow and unpaved. However, it also boasted many extravagant mosques and Muslim sanctuaries. The 14th-century Ibn Uthman Mosque and al-Zufurdimri Mosque are located in Shuja'iyya, The 15th-century Mahkamah Mosque is also located there.

Being built outside the city's wall, Shuja'iyya had more potential to grow than the al-Daraj, Zaytoun, and al-Tuffah quarters. It eventually grew to become the largest neighborhood in Gaza. It was divided into separate northern and southern parts along ethnic lines. The southern part of the area is called al-Turkuman because of the concentration of Turkoman clans who settled there during the reign of Ayyubid sultan as-Salih Ayyub between 1240 and 1249. The northern part was called al-Judaida or Shuja'iyya al-Akrad. It was populated by Kurds originally from the Mosul area.

The Ottoman census of 1525 shows a relatively equal population of Turks and Kurds, with 89 and 90 households, respectively. The Jews were the single largest ethnic group with 95 households, while the Christians had 82. In 1538, however, the Kurdish and Turkoman populations grew dramatically, especially the former. The Kurds had 278 households while the Turks had 181. In 1549, the Kurdish population grew sharply to 406 houses, while the Turkomans maintained a steady growth to 195 houses. The remnants of Mamluk military units resided in their own separate small community in Shuja'iyya. Their population consisted of 44 households in 1557 which dwindled to 66 persons in 1597.

=== Modern era ===
The Shuja'iya Primary School for Girls was founded in the neighborhood in 1967. In 2011 it had an enrollment of 1,326 students. On October 6, 1987, just before the outbreak of the First Intifada, Shuja'iyya was the site of an armed confrontation between the Palestinian Islamic Jihad and the Israeli Army (IDF). The clash resulted in the death of an IDF officer and four Islamic Jihad militants, and the day has been commemorated by the latter as the "Battle of Shuja'iyya." On the first anniversary of the operation, in 1988, the Islamic Jihad called for a general strike against Israel.

The neighborhood is a long-term stronghold of Hamas. The rival Fatah-aligned Hilles clan carried influence in Shuja'iyya until Hamas police claimed that they were hiding suspects of a previous bombing in the city, consequently resulting in clashes between police forces and clan members, resulting in nine deaths and causing several men from the Hilles clan to leave the neighborhood for resettlement in the West Bank.

Shuja'iyya had been a frequent target in Israel's 2008-09 airstrikes of the Gaza Strip, which killed several members of Hamas' security forces and destroyed the local police station. A coalition of Hamas and Islamic Jihad forces battled intensely with the IDF days after the airstrikes. Hamas claimed to have lost three fighters, including a local commander after an Israeli airstrike and the Fatah-affiliated al-Aqsa Martyrs Brigades lost a fighter after ambushing undercover Israeli forces in the district. A women and children's clinic was destroyed by an Israeli airstrike during the hostilities with no casualties reported.

During the 2014 Gaza war, Shuja'iyya was the location of the Battle of Shuja'iyya, the fiercest battle of the war, and was heavily shelled by Israeli forces. Between 65 and 120 Palestinians were killed in the fighting, including at least 17 children, 14 women and four elderly persons, as well as 13 Israeli soldiers. Israel stated the district was targeted because 8% of the rocket attacks by Palestinian forces against Israel originated in Shuja'iyya because the area was allegedly a source of tunnels crossing into Israel. After the 2014 war, an Israeli brigade gave soldiers who fought in Shuja'iyya before and after photos, showing the damage. IDF sources said the incident was under investigation. Reconstruction of the quarter is complicated by UN priorities. Funding is allocated according to a ladder of importance, from small to large-scale damage, and many of the cement vouchers for families are sold on the black market.

During the Gaza war, Shuja'iyya has been the site of three military engagements. The first two battles took place in December 2023 and June 2024, with both ending in Israeli withdrawals. During the second battle, the neighborhood experienced more than a week of Israeli bombing, with footage showing the "immense destruction" of the neighborhood. Between 60,000 and 80,000 people were estimated to have been displaced. By November 2024, more than 80 percent of the neighborhood's population was reported to be displaced and only a "few intact buildings" remaining. In April 2025, Israel began a third invasion of Shuja'iyya, during which it reportedly supported the Fatah-affiliated Shuja'iyya Popular Defense Forces against Hamas.

== Economy ==
Gaza's largest market, specializing mostly in clothes and household goods, is in Shuja'iyya; Midan Shuja'iyya ("Shuja'iyya Square") is located at the entrance of the neighborhood from the walled city quarters. Omar Mukhtar Street starts in the district and ends in Rimal. The Municipality of Gaza is implementing a project to enhance Shuja'iyya. It aims to improve the environment and living conditions of its citizens, by widening, restoring, and repairing roads in the district. There is also a development of land located along Salah ad-Din Street, known as Park al-Bastat Shuja'iyya.

== Landmarks ==
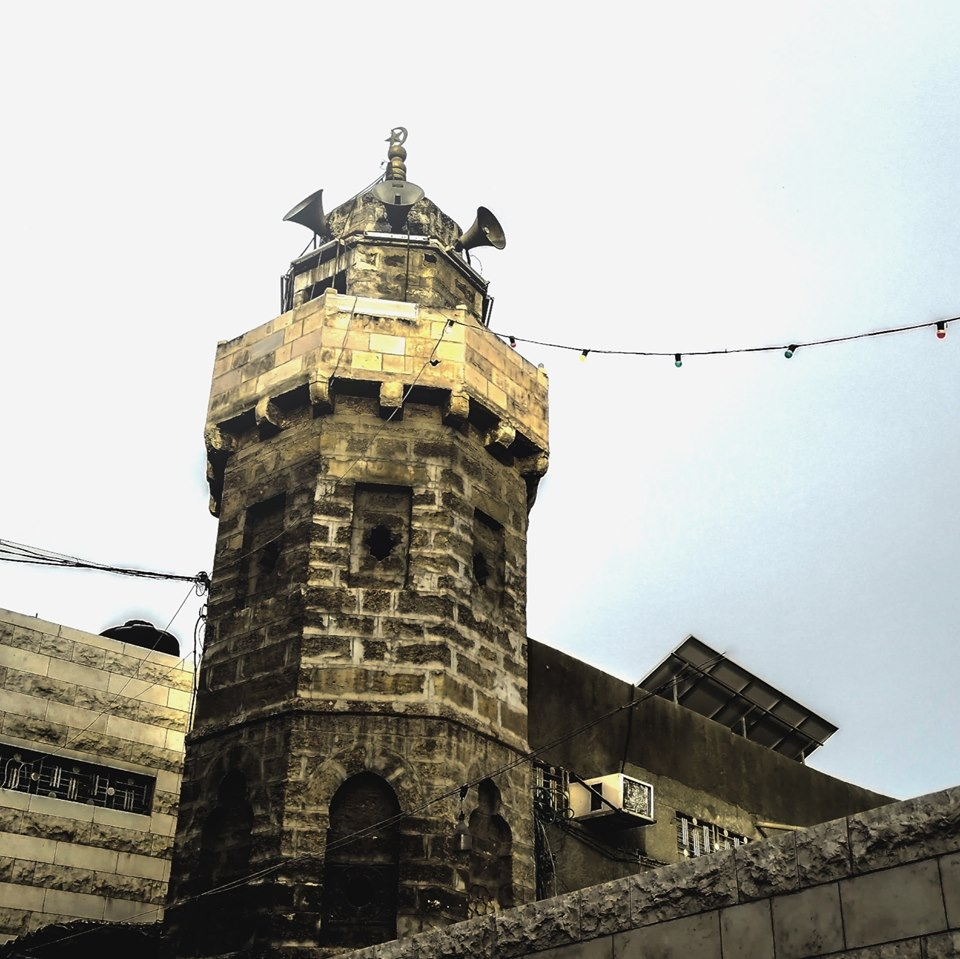
The Ibn Marwan Mosque in 2019

One of the most significant landmarks in this neighborhood is the mosque of "Ahmed bin Othman," commonly referred to by the locals as the Grand Mosque, situated at the heart of the residential and commercial district. Within this mosque lies the tomb of Saif Al-Din Yalkhaja, a Mamluk under the rule of Sultan "Al-Zahir Barquq." He served as the deputy of Gaza City in the year 849 Hijri and died in 850 Hijri, his grave is in the mosque. The Grand Mosque has several foundational stones that reveal its history of demolition and restoration, dating back to the ninth century Hijri and continuing until the mid-century. Noteworthy are its intricate engravings and decorated stones, particularly those adorning its minaret.

Another landmark in this neighborhood is the "Mahkamah Mosque," which housed a school of significant importance, as indicated by an inscription above its north-closed door.

The neighborhood is also home to various mosques, including the "Al-Hawashi Mosque," the "Lady Ruqayya Mosque," the "Ali bin Marwan Mosque" along the Salah al-Din line, the "Sheikh Musafir Mosque," the "Reform Mosque," the "Tariq ibn Ziyad Mosque," the "Qazmari Mosque" (also known as the Zofor Domri Mosque), the "Daraqutni Mosque," the "Zu al-Nurayn Mosque," and the "Sayyid Ali Mosque." Adjacent to the Grand Mosque was the Shuja'iya Bath, which has since disappeared.

To the east of this neighborhood is the "Tunisian Cemetery" or the "Tiflisi Cemetery." Additionally, one of the graves in the neighborhood's cemeteries is said to belong to the famous Samson the Mighty.

== Notable people ==
- Baha Abu al-Ata
- Khalil al-Hayya
- Rushdi al-Shawa
- Ramadan Shalah
- Ahmed Jabari
- Umm Nidal
- Ziad Abu-Amr
- Refaat Alareer

== Bibliography ==
- Abu 'Amr, Z. (1994). Islamic Fundamentalism in the West Bank and Gaza: Muslim Brotherhood and Islamic Jihad. Indiana University Press. ISBN 978-0-253-20866-8.
- Cohen, Amnon; Lewis, B. (1978). Population and Revenue in the Towns of Palestine in the Sixteenth Century. Princeton University Press. ISBN 0-691-09375-X.
- Haldimann, Marc-André; Humbert, J.-B. (2007). Gaza: à la croisée des civilisations: contexte archéologique et historique. CHAMAN Edition. ISBN 978-2-9700435-5-3.
- Jacobs, Daniel (1998). Israel and the Palestinian territories. Rough Guides. ISBN 978-1-85828-248-0.
- Meyer, Martin Abraham (1907). History of the city of Gaza: from the earliest times to the present day. Columbia University Press.
- Sharon, M. (2009). Corpus Inscriptionum Arabicarum Palaestinae, G. Vol. 4. BRILL. ISBN 978-90-04-17085-8.
