= Tuffah =

Neighborhood in Gaza City, Palestine

Tuffah التفاح
- Neighborhood
- At-Tuffah
- Interactive map of Tuffah
- Coordinates: 31°30′57.19″N 34°28′9.49″E
- Country: Palestine
- Governorate: Gaza Governorate
- City: Gaza

Government
  - Control: Contested: Israel; Hamas
- Time zone: UTC+2 (EET)
  - Summer (DST): +3

Tuffah (Arabic: التفاح, literally: "the Apple") is one of four quarters of the Old City of Gaza in the State of Palestine, located in the northeast, and is divided into eastern and western halves. Prior to its expansion and the demolition of the Old City's walls, Tuffah was one of the three walled quarters of Gaza, the other two being al-Daraj and Zeitoun. The local pronunciation of the district's name is at-tuffen.

Tuffah has existed since early Mamluk rule in Gaza in the 13th century. The southern part of Tuffah was called "ad-Dabbaghah". According to Ottoman tax records in the late 16th century, it was a small neighborhood containing 57 households. The ad-Dabbaghah neighborhood contained Gaza's slaughterhouse and tanners' facilities during the Ottoman era (1517-1917). The northern subdivision of Tuffah was called "Bani Amir".

The 14th-century Ibn Marwan Mosque is located in the district, as is the 13th-century Aybaki Mosque. Home to the British War Cemetery, Tuffah also contains a public library and a number of Palestinian Red Crescent–run schools.

During the Gaza war, the neighborhood was subjected to heavy Israeli artillery fire and airstrikes; multiple Palestinian journalists were also killed in strikes that hit the area.

On 16 April 2025, photographer Fatima Hassouna was killed in an Israeli airstrike, along with six of her relatives. The attack came one day after the announcement that her documentary Put Your Soul on Your Hand and Walk had been selected for the Cannes Film Festival.

The quarter's residents were subjected to evacuation order by the Israeli military in August 2024. The Israeli strikes hit at least two schools in the neighborhood.

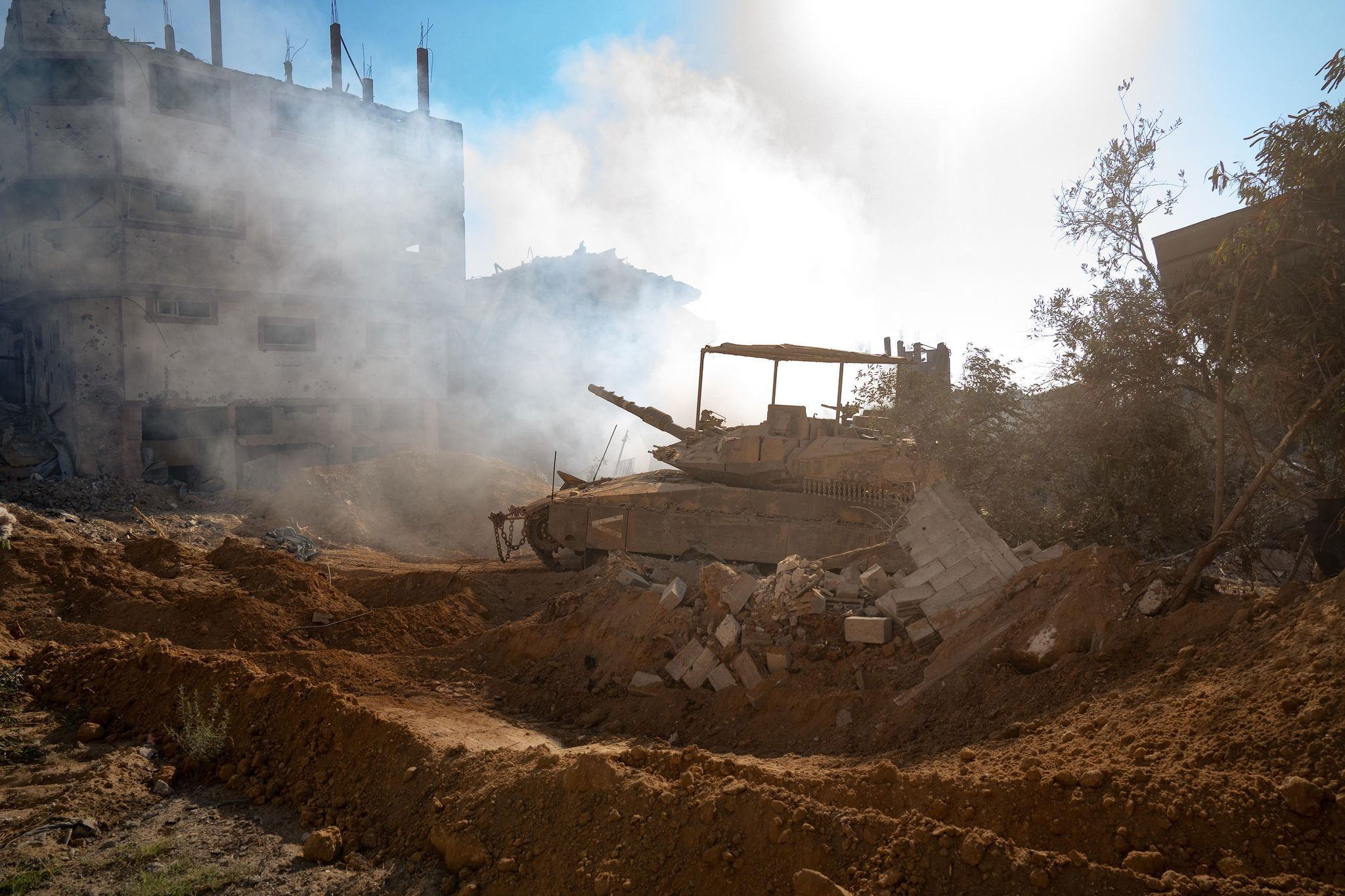
Israeli tank from the Nahal Brigade in Tuffah, July 2025

On 16 September 2025, the 13th-century Aybaki Mosque and at least 16 of the city's residential buildings were targeted by Israeli warplanes and destroyed. As the bombs rained down, the Israeli army continued to destroy areas in the north, south and east of the Gaza City with explosive-laden robots. The Israeli Defense Minister Israel Katz stated the Palestinian enclave was "burning", while thousands of people fled along the Al-Rashid coastal highway, loading belongings into carts and vans. Israeli media confirmed that the military campaign was part of the strategic plan to displace the entire Palestinian population of Gaza City and subsequently proceed with its permanent occupation.

== See also ==
- Aybaki Mosque
- Erez Crossing

== Bibliography ==
- Butt, Gerald (1995). Life at the Crossroads: A History of Gaza. Rimal Publications. ISBN 1-900269-03-1.
- Sharon, M. (2009). Corpus Inscriptionum Arabicarum Palaestinae, G. Vol. 4. BRILL. ISBN 978-90-04-17085-8.
- Shahin, Mariam (2005). Palestine: A Guide. Interlink Books. ISBN 1-56656-557-X.
- Sheehan, Sean (2000). Israel Handbook: With the Palestinian Authority Areas. Footprint Travel Guides. ISBN 978-1-900949-48-4.
