= Tourism in Palestine =

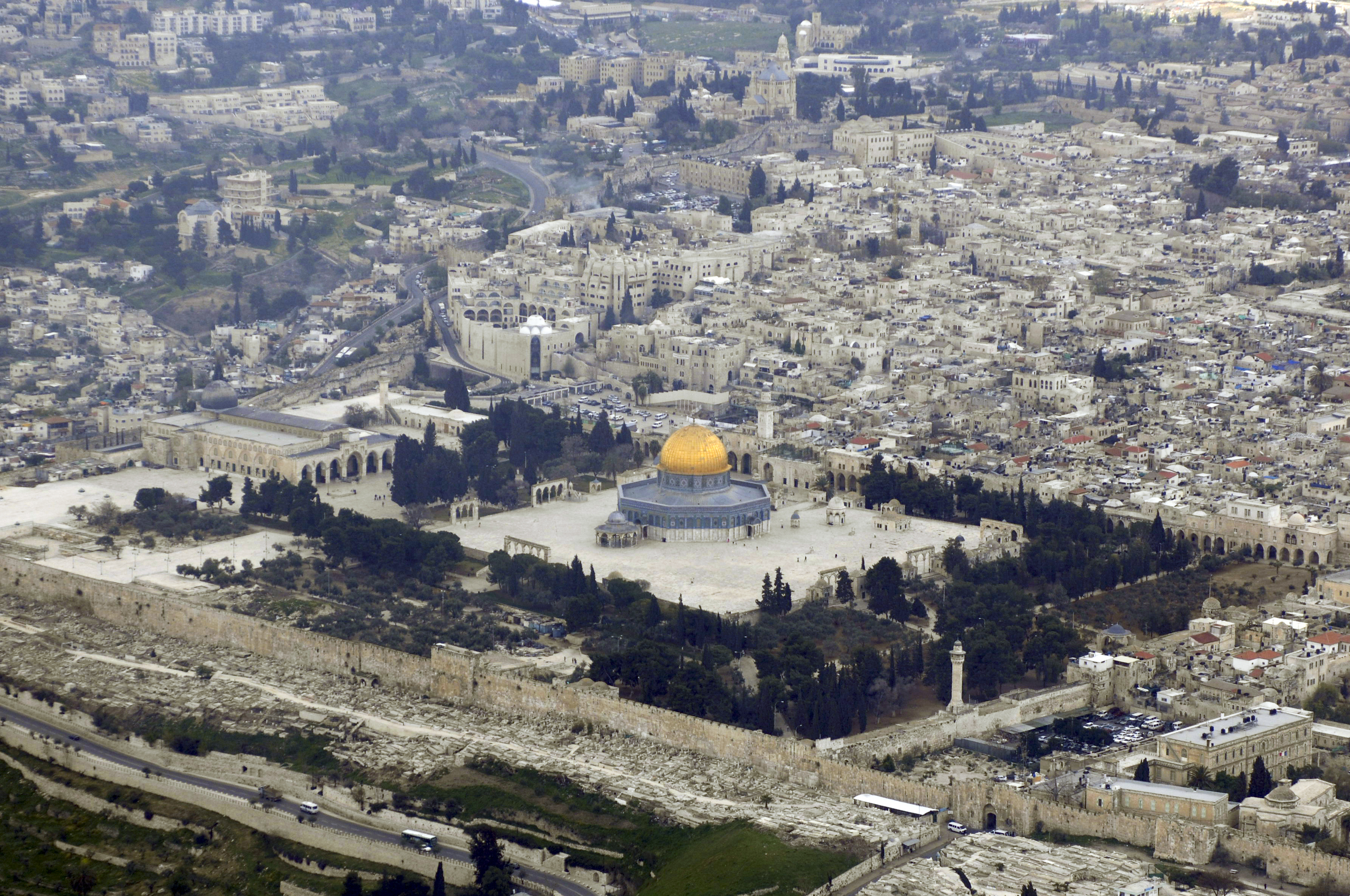
Aerial views of the Temple Mount and Haram al-Sharif and parts of the Old City of Jerusalem

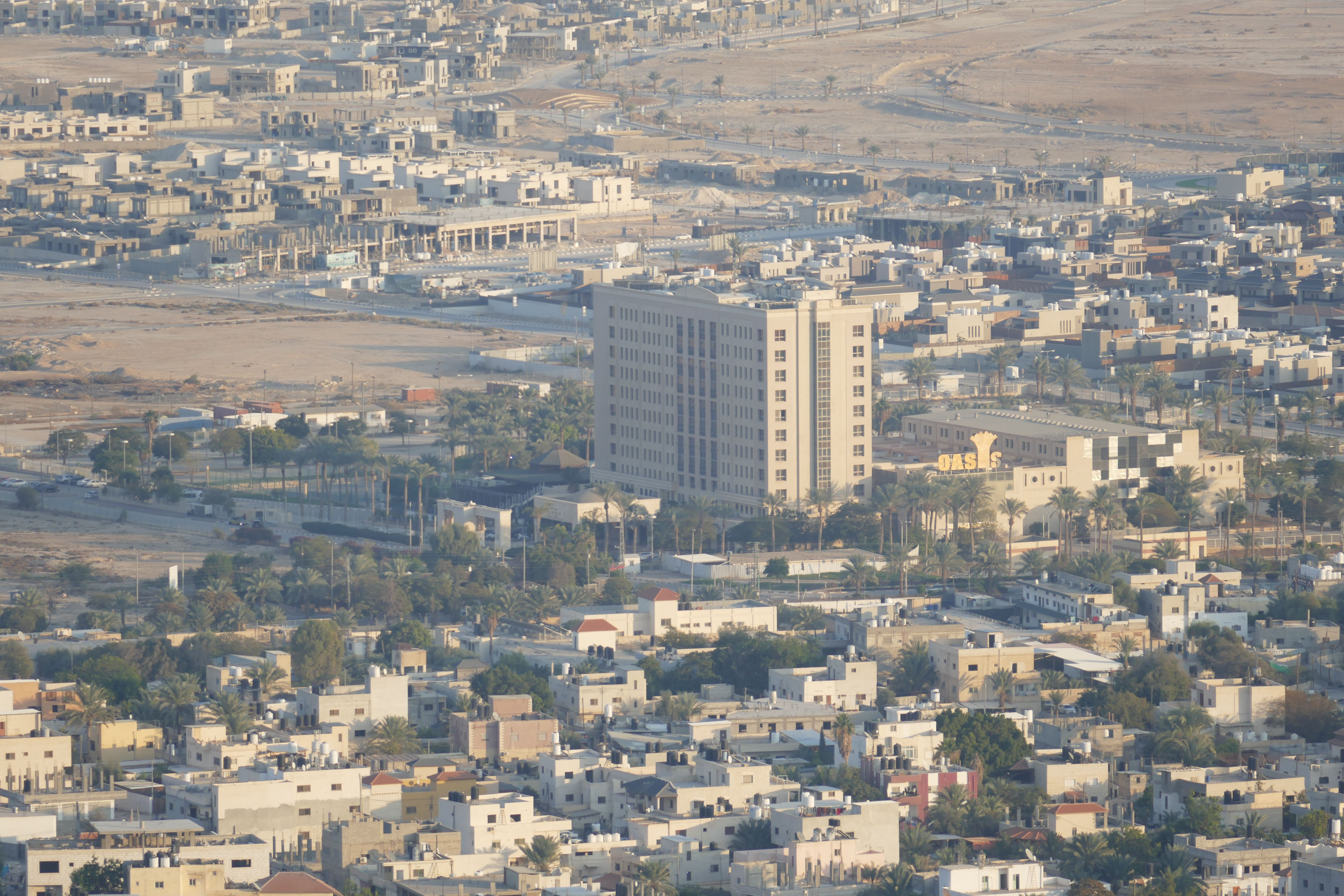
Oasis Hotel in Jericho

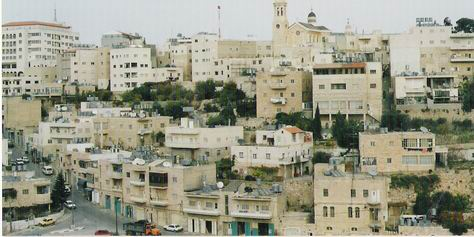
Quarter underneath the Lutheran Christmas Church in Bethlehem

Tourism in Palestine is tourism in East Jerusalem, the West Bank, and the Gaza Strip. In 2010, 4.6 million people visited Palestine, compared to 2.6 million in 2009. Of that number, 2.2 million were foreign tourists while 2.7 million were domestic. In the last quarter of 2012 over 150,000 guests stayed in West Bank hotels; 40% were European and 9% were from the United States and Canada. Major travel guides write that "the West Bank is not the easiest place in which to travel but the effort is richly rewarded."

The Palestinian tourism ministry and Israeli tourism ministry have attempted to work together on tourism in the Palestinian territories in a Joint Committee. The cooperation to share access to foreign tourists has not proven successful in Palestine for many reasons. Israel controls the movement of tourists into the West Bank. Palestinian tour guides or transportation companies have not been able to enter Israel since 2000, and in 2009, Israel's Ministry of Tourism deleted the West Bank and any Palestinian area from its materials. Former Palestinian Authority Tourism Minister Kholoud Diibes has commented "that Israel collects 90% of [religious] pilgrim-related revenue". Foreign tourism has been restricted to East Jerusalem and the West Bank since the August 2013 indefinite closing of the Rafah crossing located between Egypt and the Hamas controlled Gaza Strip. There is essentially no tourist flow to Gaza since 2005 because of the ongoing Israeli military land, sea, and air blockade.

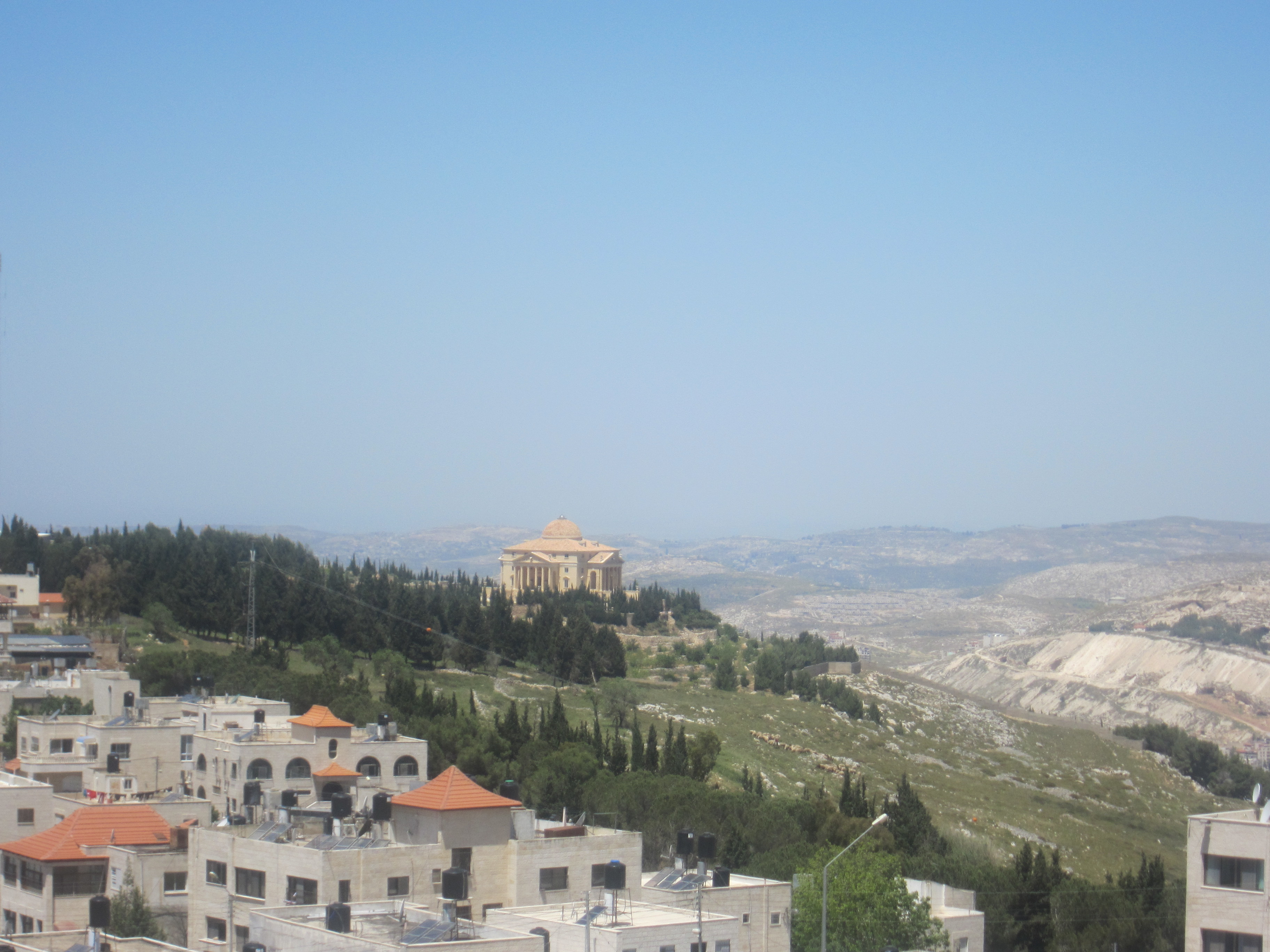
Mount Gerizim along with Nablus—the holiest site for Samaritans

In 2013 Palestinian Authority Tourism minister Rula Ma'ay'a stated that her government aims to encourage international visits to Palestine, but the occupation is the main factor preventing the tourism sector from becoming a major income source to Palestinians. There are no visa conditions imposed on foreign nationals other than those imposed by the visa policy of Israel. Access to Jerusalem and the West Bank is completely controlled by the Government of Israel. Access to Gaza is controlled by Israel and Egypt. Entry to the occupied Palestinian territories requires only a valid international passport. U.S. citizens who are suspected of being Muslims, Arabs, or "being participants in planned political protest activities or of supporting NGOs that are critical of Israeli policies" are often subjected to extensive questioning from immigration officials. These groups of tourists are subject to delay, interrogation, or even, denial of access to lawyers, consular officers, and family, and denial of entry.

Tourist arrivals of 2019 in %

== History ==
The tourist industry in the West Bank collapsed after the 1967 Arab-Israeli War, but recovered by the 1990s, especially after the Oslo Accords. The Second Intifada (2000–2006), resulted in a decline of 90% in the tourism industry, but since it has partially recovered, and in 2010, 4.6 million people visited the Palestinian territories, including 2.2 million from abroad

Tourism focuses on historical and biblical sites in East Jerusalem, Bethlehem, and Jericho, and the economy of the latter is particularly dependent on tourism. In 2007 there were over 300,000 guests at Palestinian hotels, half in East Jerusalem. NGOs including the Alternative Tourism Group promote tourism to the West Bank.

Tourism between Egypt and Gaza was active before the 1967 war, and Gaza was a resort with hotel casinos, but few tourists visited after the war. A recession in Israel in the mid-80s again reduced tourism in Gaza to almost none.

Before the Second Intifada, Gaza could be reached by tourists by taking a private taxi via the Erez crossing point from Israel, or via a flight to Gaza International Airport. The airport has been unusable since Israeli bombings in 2002. A small runway exists near the UNRWA Khan Younis refugee camp but this air strip is not serviceable due to the blockade. Gaza City attractions included the Palestine Square bazaar and the beach area, which had hotels, restaurants, and a fishing market. Israeli Arabs and Jews visited beaches in Gaza, and there were popular nightclubs.

Today, about 67% of tours to the occupied Palestinian territories are by religious Christians, mostly from North America and Europe. These modern day pilgrims visit major religious and tourist sites related to Biblical history. Many traditional religious tours are now arranging meetings with Palestinian Christians for personal interaction. Many travelers to this region feel that security concerns are overstated. The U.S. State Dept. points out that "Over three million foreign citizens, including hundreds of thousands of U.S. citizens, safely visit Israel and the West Bank each year for study, tourism, and business." There are many walking tours in the West Bank, and a celebrity chef's recent visit to Israel, the West Bank, and Gaza was followed by a show devoted to the local cuisine.

A growing number of tourist groups visit the classical holy sites but expand their trips to learn about Palestinian culture, Biblical history, and social issues. Different views are presented through personal visits with Palestinians, Christians, Muslims, and Jews often within local and international peace organizations. Religious tours that offer this type of experience include the Presbyterian Peacemaking Program and Friends of Sabeel North America. Travelers are encouraged to return and make their church communities aware of all of the issues by sharing their personal experiences. A service component may be included in these tours such as assisting in the fall olive harvest or working with church-based neutral observers to monitor and record events as part of peace-keeping efforts between Israeli settlers and local Palestinians. One travel guide suggests that "Volunteering in Palestine can be a hugely rewarding experience and opportunities in health, culture, fair trade, agriculture, youth work, and women's empowerment are listed for all areas".

== Major sites ==
=== West Bank ===
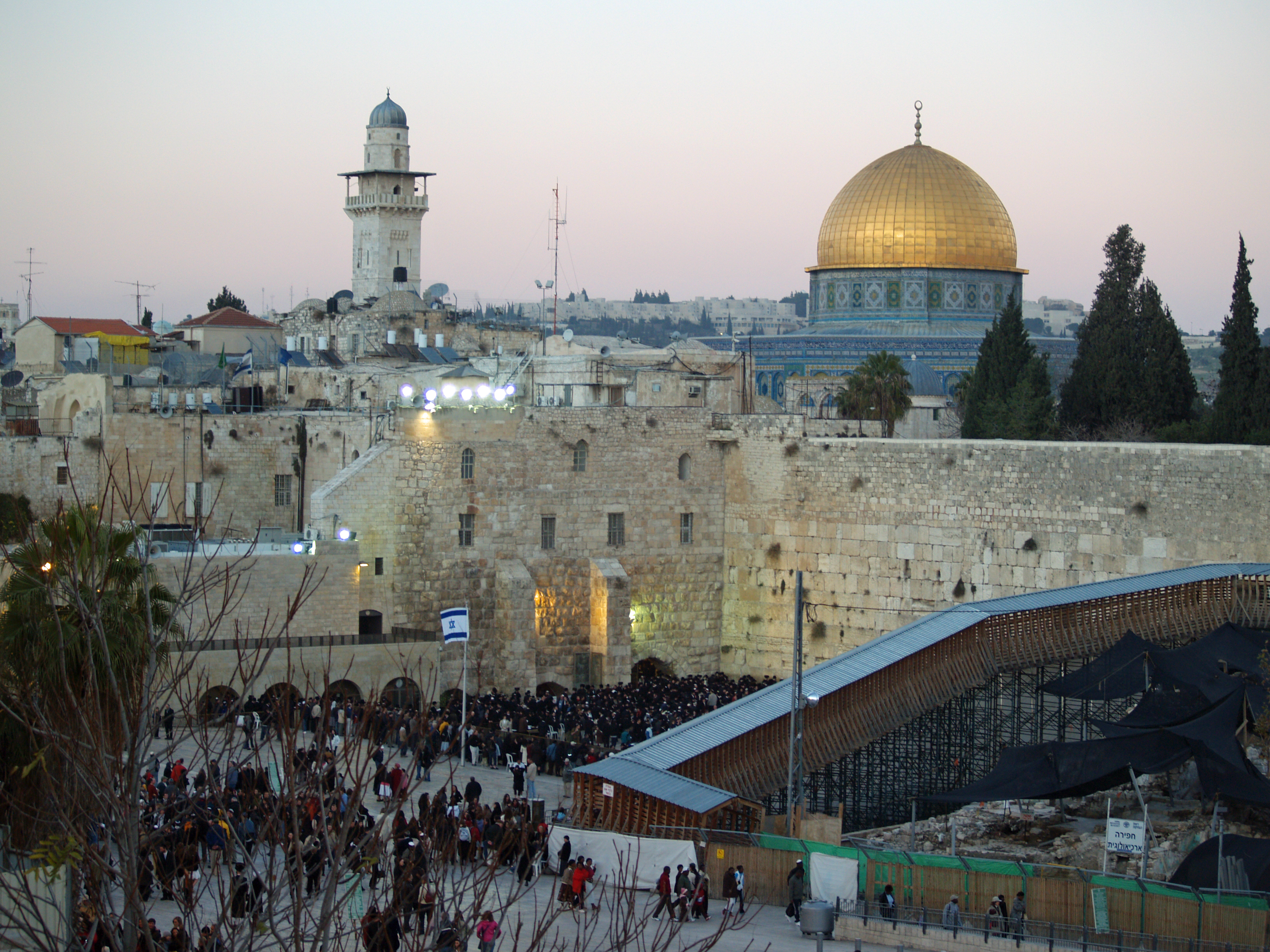
The Western Wall and Dome of the Rock in the Old City of Jerusalem

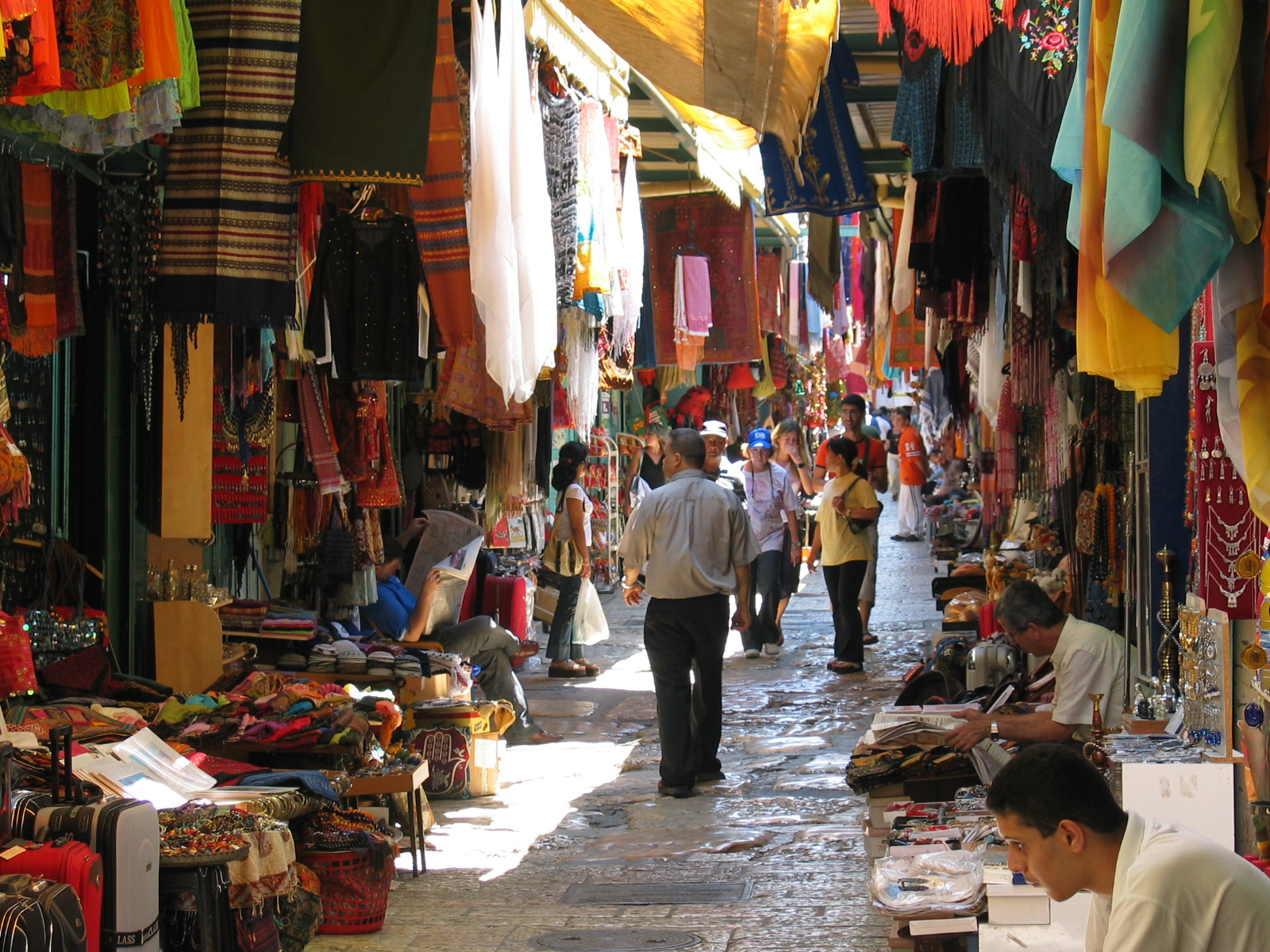
Arab market, Old City of Jerusalem

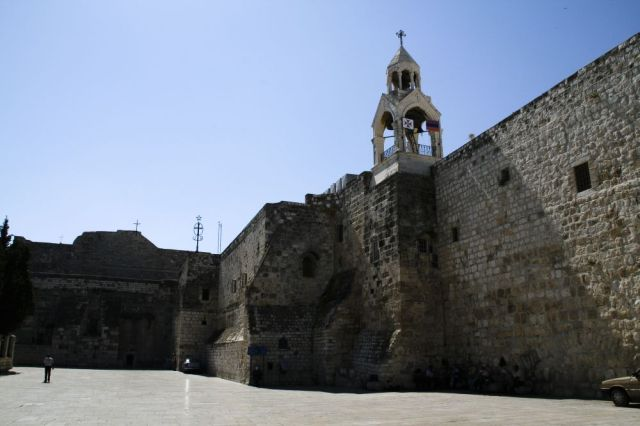
The Church of the Nativity in Bethlehem

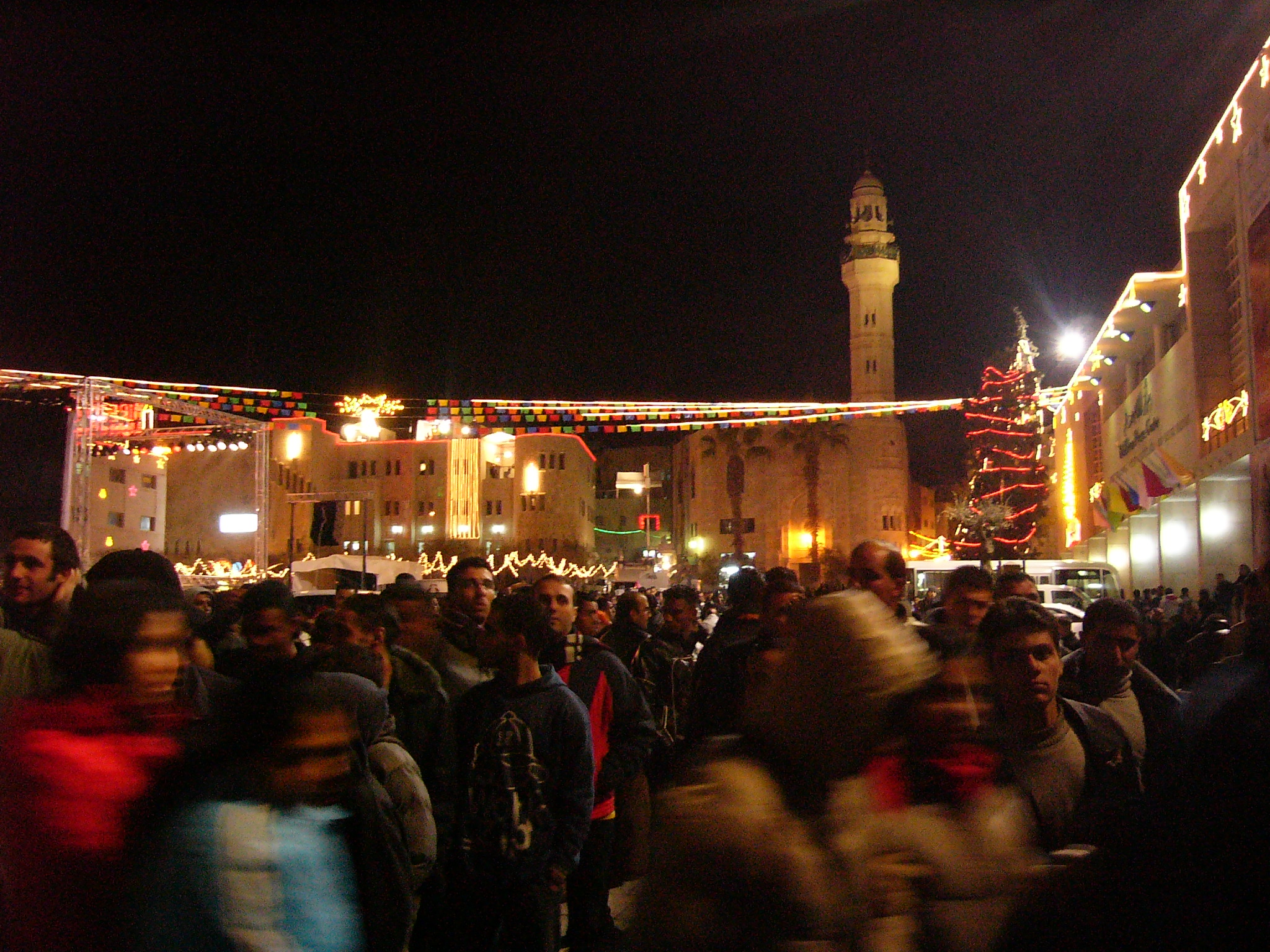
Christmas Eve 2006 in Manger Square in Bethlehem

- East Jerusalem – Serving as a focal point for the Abrahamic religions of Christianity, Islam, and Judaism, East Jerusalem is rich with religious tourist destinations, including the Old City, the Mount of Olives and Kidron Valley.
  - Within the Old City, which is traditionally divided into four quarters: the Armenian Quarter, Christian Quarter, Muslim Quarter and Jewish Quarter, sights include the Church of the Holy Sepulchre, the Temple Mount (known in Arabic as Haram ash-sharīf, the Noble Sanctuary), the Dome of the Rock, Al-Aqsa Mosque, the Western Wall, and many others. Hours could be spent exploring the streets, sights, and shops of the Old City. The Old City was designated a UNESCO World Heritage Site in 1981.
- Bethlehem – Second only to Jerusalem in importance as a tourist destination, it is the birthplace of Jesus as described in the Gospels of the New Testament. Although Christians once had been 85% of the population in 1947, their numbers have declined to about 40% by 2005. Bethlehem also has significance as a Jewish religious site since King David was born here and the Matriarch Rachael is buried in Bethlehem. Tourism is Bethlehem's main industry and there are over 30 hotels. One travel guide points out that "to get the most out of your visit it's best to stay overnight-accommodation and food are both cheaper here than what you'll get in Jerusalem". In the first eight months of 2012 about 700,000 international tourists visited the city. Bethlehem was designated a UNESCO World Heritage Site in July 2012. International popularity has resulted in fifty four cities in twenty seven countries becoming twinned (Sister Cities) with Bethlehem.
  - Church of the Nativity – A church built over the cave that tradition marks as the birthplace of Jesus of Nazareth. It is believed that it is the oldest Christian church still in daily use and a popular attraction sacred to both Christians and Muslims. 60,000 Christian pilgrims visited the Church of the Nativity during Christmas 2007.
  - Shepherd's Field – Just outside Beit Sahour, the field is said to be where Jesus's birth was announced to a group of shepherds.
  - Manger Square – A city square in the center of Bethlehem that takes its name from the manger where Jesus was born.
  - Solomon's Pools – A prominent site in the al-Khader area, named after King Solomon.
  - Salesian Cremisan Monastery – A winery as well as an active Christian convent in the suburb of Beit Jala.
- Jericho – The Biblical city is believed to be one of the oldest in the world. With its proximity to the Dead Sea, Jericho is the most popular destination among Palestinian tourists. Tourism increased by nearly 42.3% in the first three quarters of 2008 as crossing between areas under PA control and Israel became less restricted.
- Hebron – A holy city in Judaism and Islamic tradition, and the place where the Tomb of the Patriarchs and Matriarchs is located. According to the tradition, this is the burial place of the great patriarchs (Abraham, Isaac, and Jacob) and matriarchs (Sarah, Rebecca, and Leah). It was also the capital of the Kingdom of Israel before King David moved it to Jerusalem.
- Nablus – Nablus is considered the commercial capital of the West Bank. It is known for its old city and its furniture trade.
- Ramallah – Administrative and cultural capital of the West Bank, Ramallah is known for its religiously relaxed atmosphere and the cafes along its main streets.
- Jenin – 4000-year-old city in the north West Bank

== Walking tours ==
In 2012, a Dutch diplomat published a book of 25 walking tours in the West Bank. A group of walkers founded by the diplomat then numbered over 200 and organized walks nearly every weekend.

== Zimmers and biblical attractions ==
Israeli settlers in the West Bank run vacation cabins called "zimmers" with special amenities for Orthodox Jews. A biblical tourist attraction in Alon, Genesis Land, is visited by Jews, Christians, and Muslims, who take part in building Bible-era tents, herding sheep and goats, and drawing water from a well. One of the zimmers is called Abraham's Tent.

== Gaza Strip ==
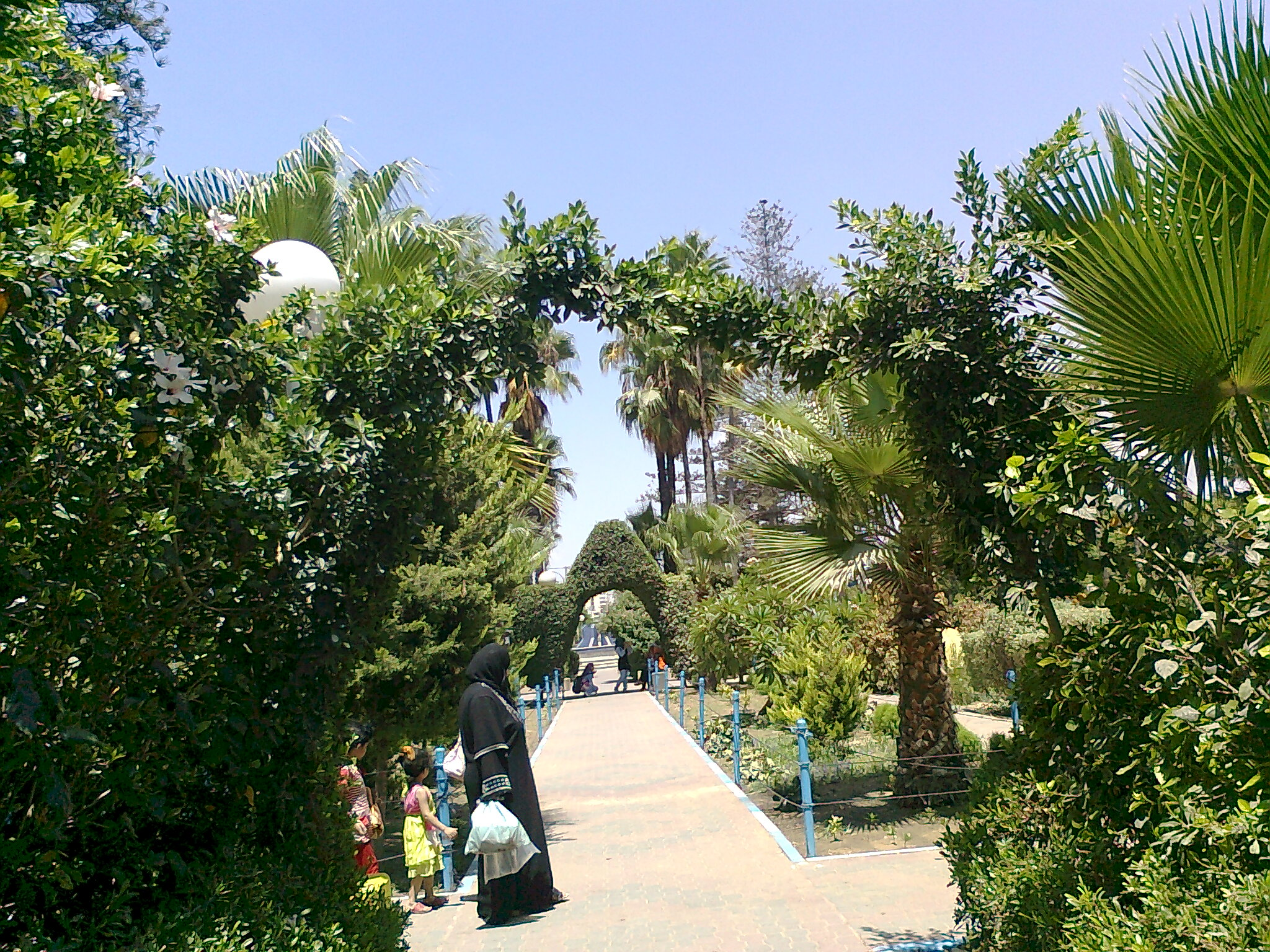
Gaza park, 2012

The climate of the Gaza Strip (an average temperature of 26 °C (79 °F) in August) and its 75 kilometres (47 mi) of coastline make it ideal for foreign tourism, which could provide a foundation for the economy of Gaza.

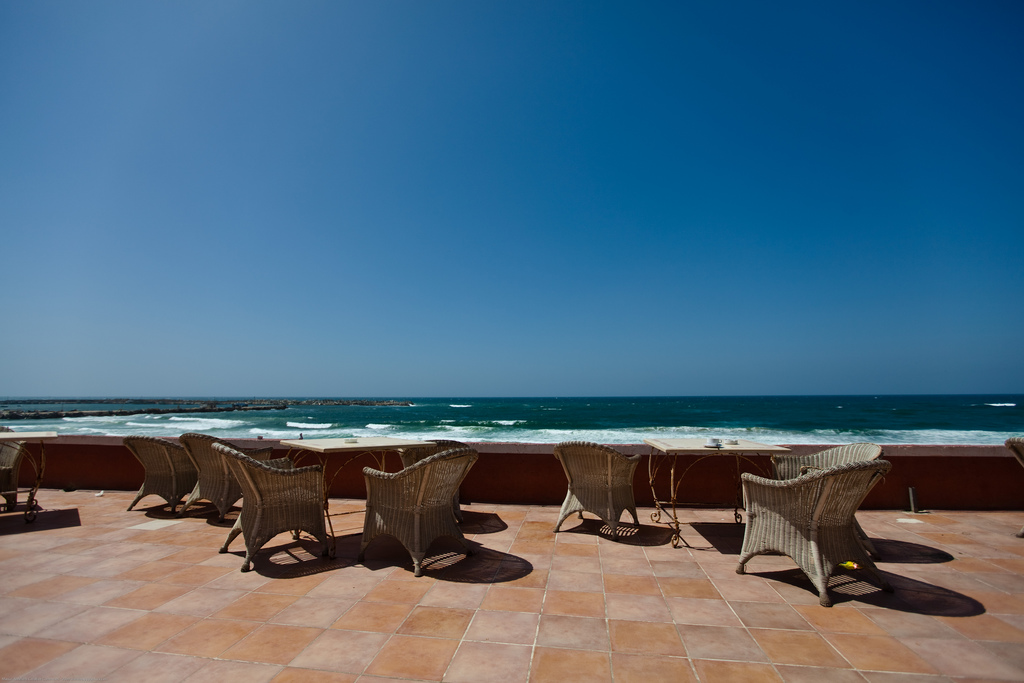
A sea view from the Al Deira hotel in 2009, since destroyed in the Gaza war

The situation remains dire in the face of the strict land, sea, and air Israeli and Egyptian blockade and the inability of Gazans to repair their water and sewage treatment facilities. The Palestinian National Authority identified the Jabalya/Beit Lahya, Gaza City, Nezarim/Wadi Gazi, and Rafah/Khan Yunis beach areas as having potential for the development of beach tourism in 2001. Following the Israeli disengagement from Gaza in August 2005 there were expectations that tourism in Gaza could be developed. In 2010 Hamas' vice police imposed rules on dress and behavior at beaches. A few upmarket hotels such as Al Deira opened in 2000, but required luxuries like soap and shampoo needed to be smuggled from Egypt due to the Israeli blockade. Guests were rare but some journalists enjoyed their visits.

In 2010 Gaza experienced a brief building boom in the construction of for-profit recreational facilities, Some of the new amusement parks and restaurants are Hamas business ventures. Among the new leisure facilities in Gaza are the Crazy Water Park, the Al-Bustan resort, and the Bisan City tourist village. Among the many new restaurants are the Roots Club, the Faisal Equestrian Club, and the new restaurant at the Gaza Museum of Archaeology which also features a high-end boutique hotel. The luxury Blue Beach Resort, Gaza opened in 2015.

The 2014 summary and statistics from the United Nations humanitarian agency, UNRWA, offers a detailed assessment of Gaza: "The tightened blockade, imposed following the Hamas takeover of Gaza in June 2007, has decimated lives and livelihoods, resulting in the impoverishment and de-development of a highly skilled and well-educated society. Despite adjustments made to the blockade by the Government of Israel in June 2010, restrictions on imports and exports continue to severely hamper recovery and reconstruction."

=== Israeli resorts ===
Before the Israeli evacuation of Gaza, resorts in Israeli settlements included the Palm Beach Hotel in Neve Dekalim. It closed in 2002 due to the Second Intifada.

== See also ==
- List of museums in Palestine
- Palestinian territories
- Visa policy of Palestine
- Tourism in Israel
