= As-Sadaka =

Swimming pool in Gaza

Coordinates: 31°32′21″N 34°27′16″E

The As-Sadaka is a 50m swimming pool in the Gaza Strip. It was inaugurated in May 2010. The pool belongs to the as-Sadaka ('Friendship') Athletic Club, and its construction was sponsored by the Islamic Society. The swimming team of as-Sadaka Athletic Clubs hold several gold and silver medals from Palestinian swimming competitions.

== Opening ==
The opening was attended by Gazan government ministers, members of the Palestinian Legislative Council, leaders of Islamic and national governing bodies, as well as club members and athletes. The General Secretary of the Islamic Society, Nasim Yaseen, thanked the donors who helped realize the project. He stated that the goal of the as-Sadaka Athletic Club was to contribute to "retaining steadfastness in the country against the occupation and tyranny which seeks undermine the resolve of our people." The ribbon was cut jointly by Nasim Yaseen and the Hamas PLC member Jamal al-Khoudouri. As-Sadaka members performed swimming exercises for the dignitaries.

== Reactions ==
Soon after the inauguration of the pool, its existence was cited by Israeli government spokespersons as demonstrating the complexity of the economic situation in Gaza. A press release was dispatched to journalists from the Israeli Government Press Office, based on a commentary by British journalist Tom Gross. Gross had published a comment on his blog which included references to the As-Sadaka pool, claiming that it showed a part of Gazan reality obscured through the "manipulative agenda of the BBC and other foreign media agencies".

The Israeli Government Press Office was inspired by Gross' dispatch and sent out an email to journalists advising to enjoy fine dining at the Roots Club and suggesting that they may also wish "to enjoy a swim at the new Olympic size swimming pool." The Guardian accused the Press Office of using Gaza's new gourmet restaurant and this new Olympic-sized swimming pool in Gaza "to highlight Israel's claim there is no humanitarian crisis there."

Israelis and supporters of Israel abroad have since used the construction of this swimming pool as a way of promoting the point of view that there is a gap between some media depictions of Gaza and the realities on the ground. Deputy Foreign Minister Danny Ayalon, for example, recently wrote that "No one claims that the situation in Gaza is perfect," but claims the "situation in Gaza is a humanitarian crisis on the scale of Darfur," are made absurd in light of the fact that "This is the same Gaza that just opened a sparkling new Gaza Mall shopping mall that would not look out of place in any capital in Europe. Gaza, where a new Olympic-sized swimming pool was recently inaugurated and five-star hotels and restaurants offer luxurious fare," and "Markets brimming with all manner of foods dot the landscape of Gaza."

== See also ==
- Economy of Gaza
