= Islamism in the Gaza Strip =

Efforts to impose Islamic law and traditions in the Palestinian Gaza Strip

Islamism in the Gaza Strip involves efforts to promote and impose Islamic laws and traditions in the Gaza Strip, both by the ruling Hamas government and other Islamist anti-Hamas groups in the region. The influence of Islamic groups in the Gaza Strip has grown since the 1980s. Following Hamas' victory in the 2006 Palestinian elections and a conflict with supporters of the rival Fatah party, Hamas took complete control of the Gaza Strip, and declared the "end of secularism and heresy in the Gaza Strip". Gaza human-rights groups accuse Hamas of restricting many freedoms.

In 2009, Ismael Haniyeh officially denied accusations that Hamas intended to establish an Islamic emirate. However, Jonathan Schanzer wrote that in two years following the Hamas takeover, the Gaza Strip had exhibited the characteristics of Talibanization, a process whereby the Hamas government had imposed strict rules on women, discouraged activities commonly associated with Western culture, oppressed non-Muslim minorities, imposed sharia law, and deployed religious police to enforce these laws.

According to a Human Rights Watch researcher, the Hamas-controlled government of Gaza stepped up its efforts to "Islamize" Gaza in 2010, efforts that included the "repression" of civil society and "severe violations of personal freedom". Israeli journalist Khaled Abu Toameh wrote in 2009 that "Hamas is gradually turning the Gaza Strip into a Taliban-style Islamic entity". According to Mkhaimar Abusada, a political-science professor at Gaza's Al-Azhar University, "Ruling by itself, Hamas can stamp its ideas on everyone (...) Islamizing society has always been part of Hamas strategy."

== Women ==
=== Dress code for women ===
==== 1970s to 1980s ====
Successful coercion of women by sectors of society to wear Islamic dress or hijab has been reported in Gaza where Mujama' al-Islami, the predecessor of Hamas, reportedly used a mixture of consent and coercion to "'restore' hijab" on urban educated women in Gaza in the late 1970s and 1980s.

==== 1980s to 1990s ====
Similar behavior was displayed by Hamas during the First Intifada. Hamas campaigned for the wearing of the hijab alongside other measures, including insisting women stay at home, segregation from men and the promotion of polygamy. In the course of this campaign, women who chose not to wear the hijab were verbally and physically harassed, with the result that the hijab was being worn 'just to avoid problems on the streets'.

==== 2007 Swords of Truth threat ====
In 2007, Islamic group Swords of Truth threatened to behead female TV broadcasters if they didn't wear strict Islamic dress. "We will cut throats, and from vein to vein, if needed to protect the spirit and moral of this nation," their statement said. The group also accused the women broadcasters of being "without any ... shame or morals." Personal threats against female broadcasters were also sent to the women's mobile phones, though it was not clear if these threats were from the same group. Gazan anchorwomen interviewed by the Associated Press said that they were frightened by the Swords of Truth's statement.

==== 2009 rules for female lawyers ====
After taking control of the Gaza Strip in June 2007, Hamas tried to enforce Islamic law in the territory, imposing the hijab on women at courts, institutions and schools.

Some of the Islamization efforts met resistance. When Palestinian Supreme Court Justice Abdel Raouf Al-Halabi ordered female lawyers to wear headscarves and caftans in court, attorneys contacted satellite television stations to protest, including Saudi state media outlet Al Arabiya, causing Hamas' Justice Ministry to cancel the directive.

==== 2009 Detention of Asma al-Ghul ====
In 2009, Asma al-Ghul, a female Palestinian journalist, stated that Hamas policemen attempted to arrest her under the pretext that she came to a Gaza beach dressed immodestly and was seen laughing in public. "They accused me of laughing loudly while swimming with my friend and failing to wear a hijab," Ghul told a human rights organization in the Gaza Strip. "They also wanted to know the identity of the people who were with me at the beach and whether they were relatives of mine." Al-Ghul added that the officers confiscated her passport, and that she had received death threats from anonymous callers following the incident. Regarding the incident, Hamas security commanders initially said that al-Ghul and her friends were stopped because they were having a mixed party at the beach. Later, one of the commanders said that al-Ghul was stopped for not wearing a hijab while swimming. Another commander said that the offense was smoking nargilas and partying in a public place. Islam Shahwan, the Hamas police spokesman, denied the detention of al-Ghul.

==== Typical clothing in the 2020s ====
In the early 2020s women have tended to dress conservatively in the Gaza Strip, but traditionally Islamic dress codes such as head scarves were not mandatory for all. Gazan Christian women do not often wear headscarves, particularly at Christian gatherings or Christian venues like the YMCA in Gaza City.

=== Islamisation of other women's issues ===
In 2009, Hamas banned girls from riding behind men on motor scooters and forbade women from dancing.

The Hamas-led government briefly implemented, then revoked, a ban on women smoking in public. In 2010, Hamas banned the smoking of hookah by women in public, stating that it was to reduce the increasing number of divorces.

In March 2010, Hamas tried to impose a ban on women receiving salon treatment from male hairdressers, issuing orders by Interior Minister Fathi Hammad and threatening offenders with arrest and trial. The group backed down after an outcry. In February 2011, according to the Palestinian Center for Human Rights, Hamas attempted to renew the ban, interrogating the five male hairdressers in Gaza City and forcing them to sign declarations that they wouldn't work in women's salons. According to one of the hairdressers, police called the five into a room where an unrelated detainee was chained to a wall by his wrists and told to sign a pledge to give up their profession or face arrest and a 20,000 shekel fine. The man initially refused but signed after his captors threatened "to take you to the cells because what you do is against Sharia". During Hamas's reign over the strip, several beauty parlors and hair salons have been the target of explosions and other attacks, which Hamas has blamed on opposition groups. Male hairdressers for women in the conservative territory are rare.

In 2013, UNRWA canceled its annual marathon in Gaza after Hamas rulers prohibited women from participating in the race.

In 2015, Hamas banned New Year's Eve celebrations based on the Gregorian calendar, stating that such celebrations "offended the territory's values and religious traditions." This was after the Islamic New Year had begun in October.

=== Polygamy ===
Polygamy has burgeoned under the Hamas government, and the overall rate of marriage has decreased. Polygamy was already practised in some Bedouin communities in Israel, and some Palestinians with Israeli citizenship, particularly in the Negev desert (Arabic pronunciation: Naqab) surrounding the Gaza Strip.

== Book banning ==
In 2007, the banning of a book of Palestinian folktales, Speak, Bird, Speak Again, which is a collection of 45 Palestinian folk tales, because of some supposedly lewd content, caused an outcry. The Palestinian novelist Zakariya Mohammed warned that Hamas' decision to ban the book was "only the beginning" and he urged intellectuals to take action. He said: "If we don't stand up to the Islamists now, they won't stop confiscating books, songs and folklore". The decision to ban the book was shortly thereafter reversed due to widespread outcry.

== Music and entertainment ==
One of the most obvious difference between Hamas and the smaller more fundamentalist groups in the Gaza Strip is music. Hamas do not object to most music, and music has long been a key element of the Palestinian Nationalist movement.

=== Entertainment venue bombings (2006-2007) ===
Beginning in October 2006, during the Fatah-Hamas conflict, and continuing into mid-2007, dozens of Internet cafes and music shops in Gaza were attacked by unknown assailants who detonated small bombs outside businesses at night, causing damage but no injuries. Ramzi Shaheen, the Gaza police spokesman, told Ha'aretz in 2007 that the method of operation was always the same but that they had no hard proof as to who was behind the attacks and had yet to make arrests. Ramzi Abu Hilao, a pool hall owner whose establishment was blown up said he had received no prior warning but that, "I received a written message after the bombing from a group called 'The Swords of Truth' that began with a verse from the Quran and said they wanted to correct the bad behavior in Palestinian society." Hamas spokesman Ismail Ridwan denied any connection with the group.

Police said that no credible claims of responsibility had been made for the attacks, dismissing a statement that appeared on a news Web site in December from an unknown group with alleged links to Al-Qaeda. Haaretz noted that, "There has been no conclusive proof that Al-Qaida has established a Gaza branch. Observers believe the vice squad is most likely homegrown."

=== Propagation of Virtue and the Prevention of Vice in 2007 ===
In 2007, the Gaza Strip's Committee for the Propagation of Virtue and the Prevention of Vice, which at the time claimed to be independent of the Hamas government, beat up a local singer in Gaza after he gave a concert in Khan Younis, according to the London-based newspaper Al-Quds Al-Arabi.

=== Arab Idol 2013 ===
In 2013, Gazan singer Mohammed Assaf won Arab Idol, a regional singing competition TV show. A Hamas spokesperson initially condemned the name and idea of the show as blasphemous, but later a Hamas legislator praised Assaf as the "ambassador for Palestinian art".

=== ISIS sympathisers in 2021 ===
In August 2021, ISIS-inspired groups in the Gaza Strip accused Bianco Resort, one of the Gaza Strip's most luxurious seaside tourist sites, of holding a music concert for men and women, before attacking the resort with an explosive device.

=== Police raid on hip hop concert in 2010 ===
In April 2010, Hamas sent police to break up the Gaza Strip's first major hip-hop concert, which it viewed as immoral conduct. It said organizers failed to get a permit.

=== Water park ===
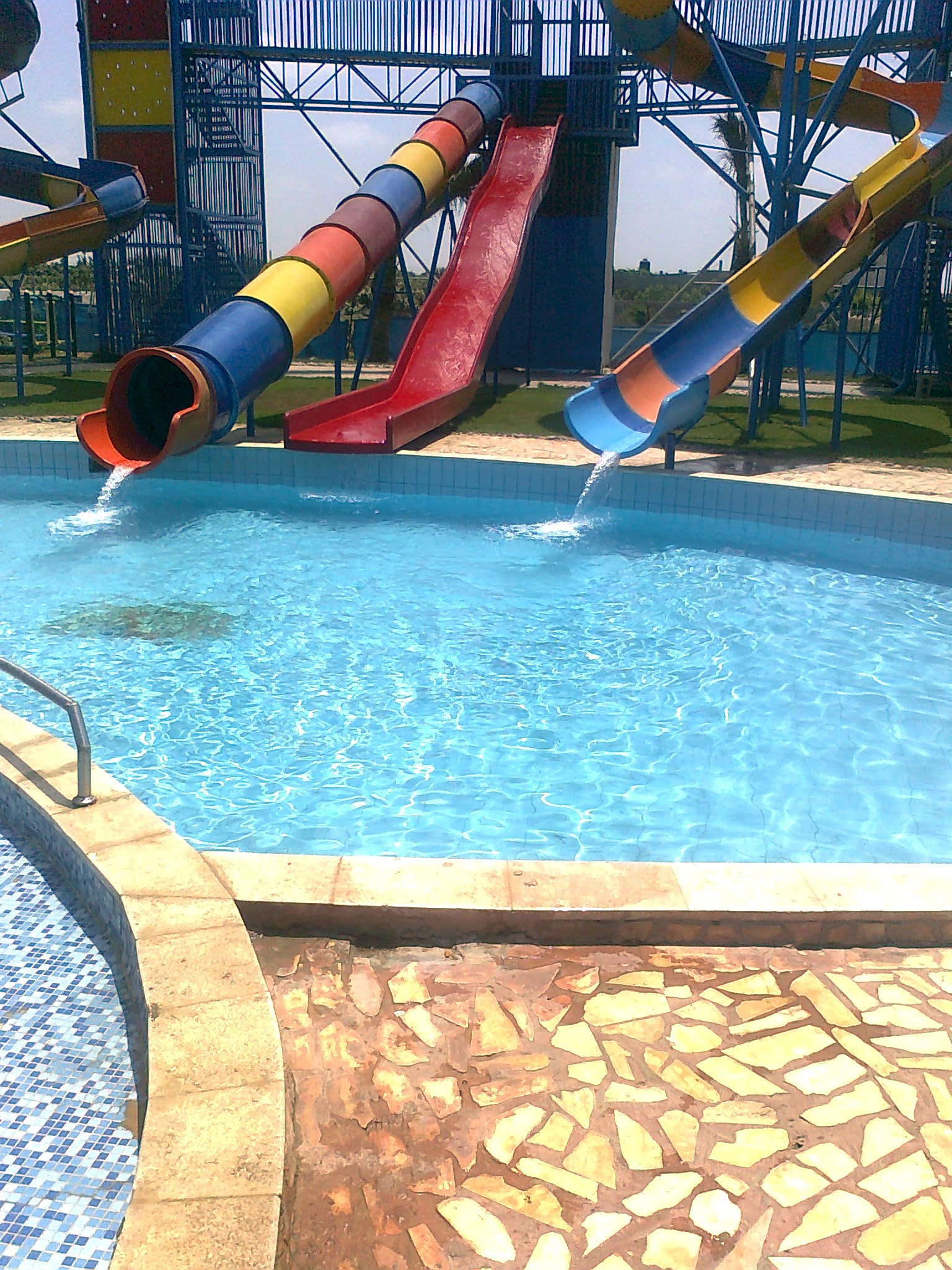
Crazy Water Park, Gaza Strip

In 2010, human rights activists said that Hamas stepped up its efforts to impose strict Islamic teachings in the Gaza Strip. Crazy Water Park, one of the Gaza Strip's most popular entertainment sites, was closed down by Hamas for allowing mixed bathing. Two weeks later, the site was set on fire by a group of unknown gunmen. The Hamas government issued a strong condemnation and promised to pursue the perpetrators. The government had already a week earlier ordered the closure of Crazy Water Park for three weeks due to it not having a proper license.

Although it is not clear which Islamist group was behind the action, Islamist militants who objected to mixed-gender socializing destroyed Gaza's water park.

== Children's summer camps ==
In May 2010, a previously unknown militant group calling itself "The Free of the Homeland" issued a statement criticizing the United Nations Relief and Works Agency (UNRWA), for running camps in the Gaza Strip "teaching schoolgirls fitness, dancing and immorality". Two days later, about 20 men armed with assault rifles attacked a UNRWA-run summer camp. The assailants tore up large plastic tents and burned storage facilities at the site, according to an eyewitness. John Ging, UNRWA's director of operations in Gaza, called the incident "an attack on the happiness of children". A Hamas spokesman condemned the attack and pledged authorities "will track down the perpetrators".

In a separate incident in June 2010, a group of about two dozen armed and masked men attacked a UNRWA summer camp in Gaza. The assailants tied up an unarmed guard, then tried to set fire to two tents and a perimeter fence. They also used knives, slashing a plastic swimming pool, blow-up slide and toys. John Ging called it a "cowardly and despicable" attack. Hamas condemned the attack and said it was investigating.

== Other prohibitions ==
The "Islamic Endowment Ministry" created by the Hamas administration has deployed Virtue Committee members to warn people of the dangers of dating, card playing and immodest dress. The government has also imposed temporary closures on facilities like the cafes of the Crazy Water Park and the Faisal Equestrian Club where men and women were mingling socially.

It was reported that young Palestinians in Gaza were being targeted by Islamist gunmen and Hamas security forces for wearing hair gel, with some of them being beaten and shaved against their will.

In 2008, Hamas instructed the main Palestinian telecoms company, Paltel to block access to pornographic internet sites. "Palestinian society suffers because of such immoral sites. We have therefore taken the decision to protect morality, and this remains our policy," said Hamas telecommunications minister Yussef al-Mansi.

Men are banned from swimming topless.

Hamas banned public dog walking in May 2017, stating it was to "protect our women and children". Hamas officials stated that the ban was in response to a rise in dog walking on the streets which they stated was "against culture and traditions in Gaza".

== Effects on Christian population ==
In 2007, about 3,000 Gazans were Christian, out of the total population of 1.5 million. In 2011, the Christian population of Gaza Strip was less than 1,400. Attacks on Christians and their property are rare, with the notable exception of those on The Teacher's Bookshop. A member of the Catholic faith told The Guardian he was stopped by a Hamas official and told to remove a wooden crucifix he was wearing; he refused and was threatened with arrest, but eventually was let go.

In 2007, Islamism was putting pressure on the tiny Christian minority. Following the Hamas takeover of Gaza in 2007, Abu Saqer, leader of Jihadia Salafiya, a rival group to Hamas, announced the opening of a "military wing" to enforce Muslim law in Gaza. "I expect our Christian neighbors to understand the new Hamas rule means real changes. They must be ready for Islamic rule if they want to live in peace in Gaza." Sheik Saqer has asserted that there is "no need" for Christians in Gaza to maintain a large number of institutions in the territory and demanded that Hamas "must work to impose an Islamic rule or it will lose the authority it has and the will of the people."

In October 2007, Rami Khader Ayyad, owner of Gaza's only Christian bookstore, was abducted, beaten and murdered, after his bookstore was firebombed by an unidentified group attacking targets associated with Western influence. According to Ayyad's family and neighbors, he had regularly received anonymous death threats from people angered by his missionary work. Ismail Haniyeh, leader of Hamas in Gaza, condemned Ayyad's killing and said Hamas "would not allow anyone to sabotage Muslim-Christian relations." Hamas officials made visits to Christian community, and its spokesman promised to bring those responsible to justice. No group claimed responsibility for the murder.

Ayyad's funeral was attended by 300 Muslims and Christians. The Palestinian Centre for Human Rights stated "This ugly act has no support by any religious group here."

In 2012, a public protest was organized by dozens of Christians who claimed that two Christians were forcibly converted to Islam and were being held against their will. According to two mediators, the two Christians embraced Islam of their own free will. The conversions have the minority Christian population worried, and Huda Al-Amash, the mother of one of the converts, Ramez, stated, "If things remain like this, there'll be no Christians left in Gaza." Gaza's Archbishop Alexious said that the converts should be returned to their families.

== Conflict between Hamas and more extreme groups ==
In 2015 – coinciding with the rise of the self-described "Islamic State" in Iraq and Syria (ISIS) and in the neighbouring "Sinai Province" – the Hamas led government launched a campaign to combat “extremist ideology” in the Gaza Strip.

== Taliban comparisons ==
=== Criticism by other Palestinians ===
Palestinian researcher Dr. Khaled Al-Hroub has criticized what he called the "Taliban-like steps" Hamas has taken. He wrote, "The Islamization that has been forced upon the Gaza Strip – the suppression of social, cultural, and press freedoms that do not suit Hamas's view[s] – is an egregious deed that must be opposed. It is the reenactment, under a religious guise, of the experience of [other] totalitarian regimes and dictatorships". Extremist Islamist groups like ISIS object to both Hamas and the Taliban for their nationalism.

=== Allegations of "Talibanization" by Hamas ===
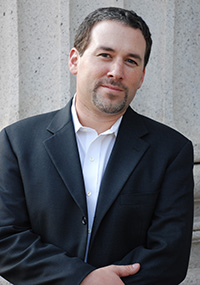
Jonathan Schanzer, American intelligence analyst: "The Gaza Strip has exhibited the characteristics of Talibanization, whereby the Islamist organization imposed strict rules on women, discouraged activities commonly associated with Western or Christian culture, oppressed non-Muslim minorities, imposed sharia law, and deployed religious police to enforce these laws"

According to Francesca Giovannini of the University of California Berkeley, a growing number of analysts have denounced openly the "systematic, massive and explicit efforts" at 'Talibanization' led by Hamas in the Gaza Strip.

Israeli-Arab journalist Khaled Abu Toameh wrote in 2009 that Hamas is gradually turning the Gaza Strip into a Taliban-style Islamic entity.

In the same year, Martin Peretz, editor-in-chief of The New Republic, wrote that:

The fact is that Hamas is a Taliban state, as one Israeli diplomat put it. This is almost an epiphany, a clarifying truth. Hamas operates against its Palestinian enemies like the Taliban does against its Afghani enemies. Imagine a Hamas squad enters a kindergarten in a kibbutz. Neither the Taliban nor Hamas strive for earthly aims. Armed with instruments of death, they each fight for a heavenly design. But on earth.... The Taliban are not analogous to Hamas. They are identical, equivalent. A ceasefire with Hamas is a delusion. Engage with whom?

Director general of the Palestinian interior ministry, Samir Mashharawi, said to the London daily Al-Hayat: "Hamas aims to establish a mini-state in the Gaza Strip modeled on the Taliban [state] in Afghanistan.". According to Jonathan Fighel, a senior researcher at the International Institute for Counter Terrorism (ICT), the ideological and strategic goal of Hamas is to destroy Israel in order to build on it a Sharia Islamic Taliban-style state.

In 2008, Following the bitter Fatah–Hamas conflict, Mahmoud Abbas, President of the Palestinian National Authority, warned the Palestinian people against Hamas: "Hamas have brought Hizballah and Iran... This is a struggle against the Emirate of Darkness and Backwardness. Gaza will turn into a Taliban-style Islamic emirate with Iranian and Syrian support."

Al-Ayyam columnist, Abd Al-Nasser Al-Najjar, called Hamas "the new Taliban" and wrote: "How will the mini-state of the new Taliban [i.e. Hamas] manage the affairs of the Gaza Strip under a suffocating international siege?... Will they implement the laws of Islam?... An Islamic state [ruled by] the new Taliban has become a reality in Gaza."

== See also ==
- Committee for the Propagation of Virtue and the Prevention of Vice (Gaza Strip)
- Hamastan
