= Economy of the Gaza Strip =

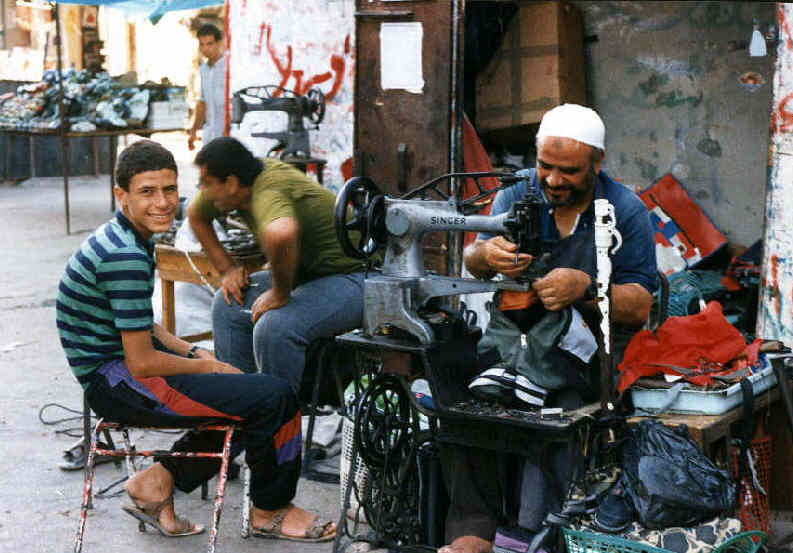
Backyard industry

The economy of the Gaza Strip was dependent on small industries and agriculture. After years of decline, the Gaza economy experienced some growth in the late 2000s, boosted by foreign aid.

== History ==
=== 19th century: Traditional economy ===
In the 19th century, Gaza City was among six soap-producing cities in the Levant, overshadowed only by Nablus. Its factories purchased qilw (alkaline soda) from merchants from Nablus and Salt in Jordan. The city's port was eclipsed by the ports of Jaffa and Haifa, but it retained its fishing fleet. Although its port was inactive, land commerce thrived because of its strategic location. Most caravans and travelers coming from Egypt stopped in Gaza for supplies, likewise Bedouins from Ma'an, east of the Wadi Araba, bought various sorts of provisions from the city to sell to Muslim pilgrims coming from Mecca. The bazaars of Gaza were well-supplied and were noted by Edward Robinson as "far better" than those of Jerusalem. Its principal commercial crop was cotton which was sold to the government and local Arab tribes.

=== 20th century: Under four countries ===
The Second Intifada led to a steep decline in the economy of Gaza, which was heavily reliant upon external markets. Israel—which had begun its occupation by planting approximately 618,000 trees in Gaza in 1968 and improving seed selection—over the first 3-year period of the Second Intifada, destroyed 10 percent of Gazan agricultural land, and uprooted 226,000 trees. The Gazan population became largely dependent on humanitarian assistance, primarily from UN agencies.

=== 21st century: Rises and falls ===
==== 2000s: Israel disengages ====
The Gaza economy has become increasingly reliant on external aid, which has not only failed to reduce this dependency but has often exacerbated it. Aid programs are frequently designed to align with Israeli security standards, which inadvertently legitimizes the economic restrictions imposed on Palestinians. This has led to a situation where, despite substantial investments in infrastructure and institutional development since the Oslo Accords, the economic landscape remains fragile and underdeveloped.

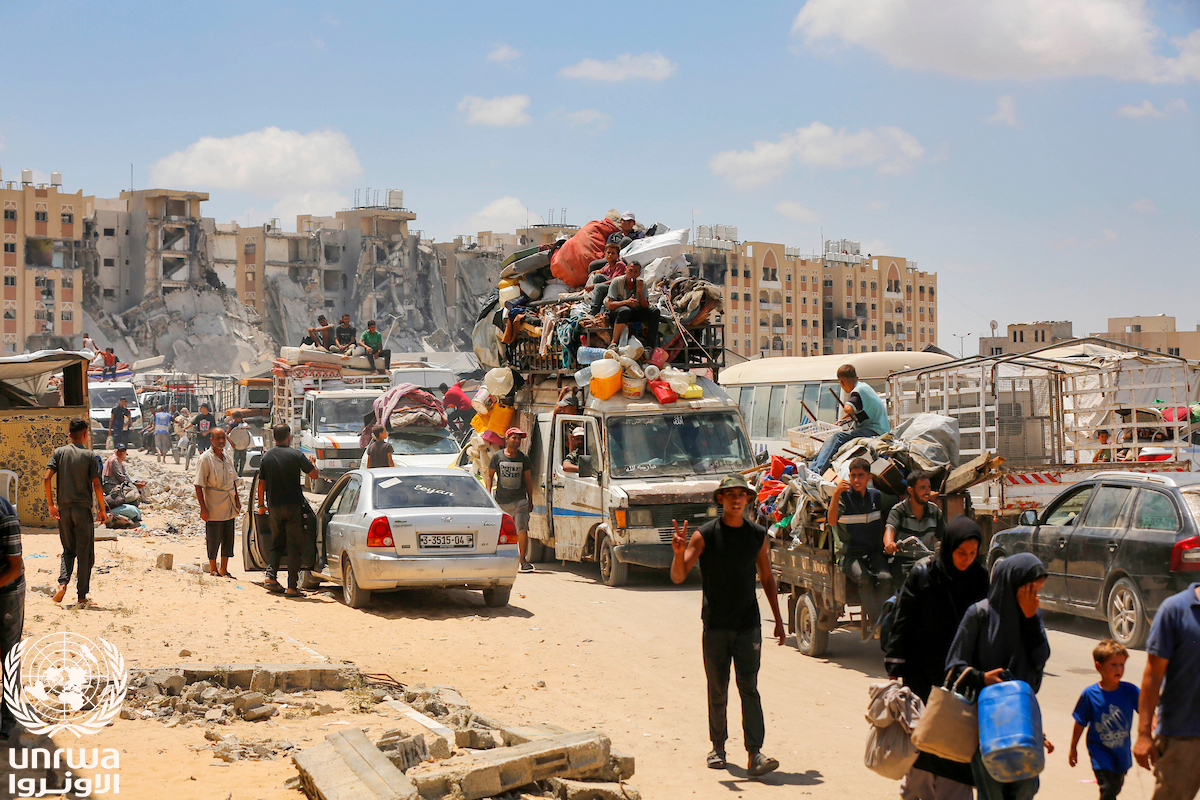
Before the Gaza war there were around 88,000 registered automobiles in the Gaza Strip. By late 2025, it was estimated that 25,000–33,000 had been destroyed.

The focus of many donor agencies and NGOs has shifted towards short-term relief efforts rather than sustainable development initiatives. This approach is often a response to the deteriorating security situation, which creates urgent humanitarian needs. However, these short-term programs have not translated into meaningful progress in economic or social development. The ease of implementing relief programs, due to fewer security restrictions, has further entrenched this cycle of dependency.

The European Union paid €420 million in aid to the Palestinian territories in 2001. This was in addition to contributions by individual member states. This included €55 million from Germany, €67 million from France, and £63.6 million (about €76 million) from Great Britain in 2007 alone. Donation levels have since increased, with the United States and the European Union giving $7.7 billion in 2008–2010.

In September 2000, 24,000 Palestinians crossed out of Gaza daily to work in Israel. Many Gazans worked in the Israeli service industry while the border was open, but in the wake of Israel's 2005 disengagement plan, Gazans could no longer do so. According to OXFAM, Gaza suffered from serious shortages in housing, educational facilities, health facilities, infrastructure, and an inadequate sewage system, contributing to serious hygiene and public health problems.

After Israel's disengagement, there was increased freedom of movement within Gaza due to Israel's removal of its settlements. Smugglers, militant groups, and entrepreneurs dug tunnels into Egypt, creating a booming "tunnel economy". Israel's disengagement also resulted in loss of the settlement factories, workshops, and greenhouses where Gazans were employed.

==== 2000s: Hamas government in the Gaza Strip ====
Several military conflicts have seriously damaged the economy of Gaza since Hamas took political control in 2005: Gaza War (2008–2009), 2012 Gaza War, 2014 Gaza War, November 2018 Gaza–Israel clashes, 2021 Israel–Palestine crisis, and the Gaza war (2023–present). In June 2005, there were 3,900 factories in the city employing 35,000 people, and in December 2007, 195 factories were remaining, employing 1,700 people. The construction industry was also affected, with tens of thousands of employees out of work. The blockade damaged the agriculture sector and 40,000 workers dependent on cash crops were left without income. Unemployment was compounded when Israel ended its reliance on cheap labor from the Gaza Strip in 2005.

In 2007, unemployment in the Gaza Strip reached 40%. According to Oxfam, the private sector which employs 53% of all working Gazans was devastated and many businesses went bankrupt. Of the 110,000 workers in this sector, approximately 75,000 lost their jobs. 95% of the city's industrial operations were suspended due to the inaccessibility to inputs for production and the inability to export products.

In 2007, households spent an average of 62% of their total income on food, compared to 37% in 2004. In a decade, the number of families depending on UNRWA food aid increased tenfold. Food prices rose during the blockade, with wheat flour going up 34% and rice up 21%. The number of poor Gazans increased sharply, with 80% relying on humanitarian aid in 2008 compared to 63% in 2006.

==== 2010s: Construction boom ====
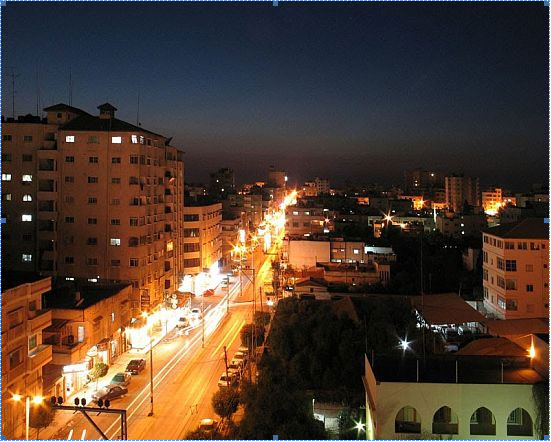
Gaza at night, 2012

According to the International Monetary Fund, the unemployment rate was falling. The economy of Gaza grew by 16% in the first half of 2010, almost twice as fast as the economy of the West Bank. Increasing prosperity has led to the widespread replacement of donkey carts with tuk-tuks. In 2011 Gaza's economy increased by 27% while unemployment fell to 29%, its lowest in a decade.

In 2012, Qatar donated 400 million dollars towards construction projects in the Gaza Strip. That year, 250 trucks a day passed through the Kerem Shalom border crossing, transporting goods from Israel to the Gaza Strip. In the early 2010s, NIS 75 million have been invested in upgrading and expanding the crossing, which is capable of handling 450 trucks a day. The Palestinian side of the crossing is operated by two families who were granted a franchise by the Palestinian Authority and authorized by Hamas. The Ministry of Commerce and Industry in Ramallah coordinates activity with Israel. The two sides are 400 meters apart, separated by a drop-off zone for unloading goods.

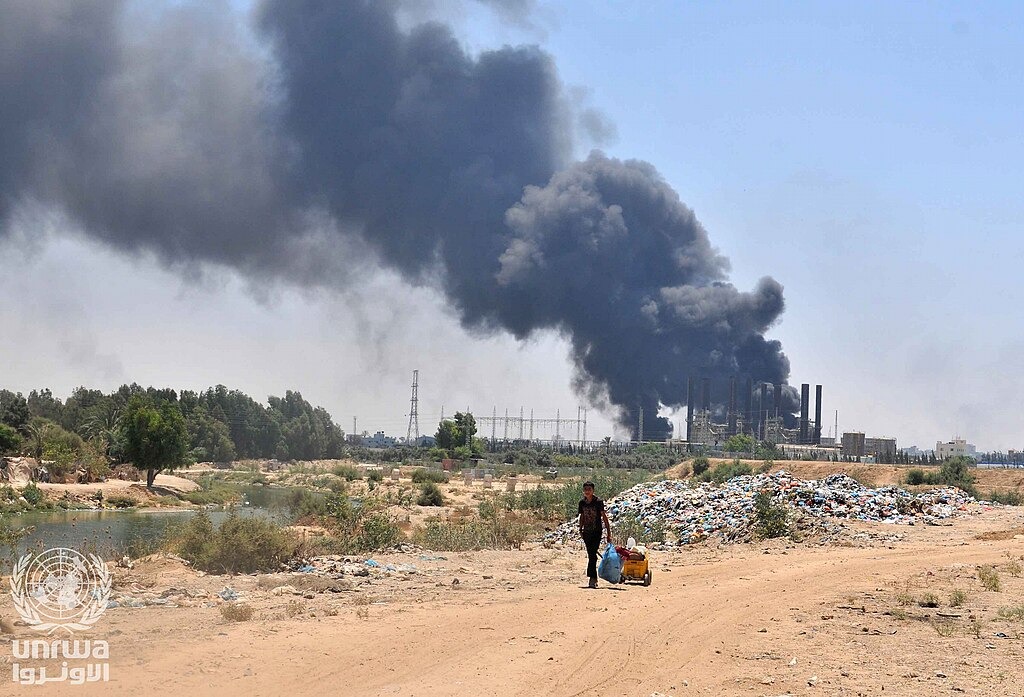
The Gaza Power Plant was attacked by the Israeli army during the 2014 Gaza War.

The Palestinian Authority estimated that the damaged caused by the 2014 Gaza War would cost US$7.8 billion to repair. 20,000 homes were destroyed as a result of the conflict.

==== 2020s: Economic collapse and war ====
In 2020, the GDP of the Gaza Strip was US$1,049 per capita, much lower than the corresponding figure for the West Bank. In August 2020, Ali al-Hayek, the head of the Palestinian Businessmen's Association in Gaza, told The Media Line that "Gaza's economy has completely collapsed, especially amid the latest escalation, where closing the Kerem Shalom cargo crossing and not allowing the entry of fuel and industrial materials led to an economic catastrophe," he said. The industrial sector has come to a complete halt, leaving thousands of workers without jobs, added to the already collapsing situation, Hayek said. "The private sector in Gaza is almost dead; we're facing a serious collapse that is reflected in social issues because of the suspension of the economic system. "Economic activity has completely stopped in Gaza," he said. Hayek said 2020 was the Strip's worst year yet, with the current difficulties coming atop the problems suffered since 2007, when Gazans faced daily closures. "But today, we are talking about a complete stop [to economic activity] because of the previously existing crisis and the current halt of electric service."

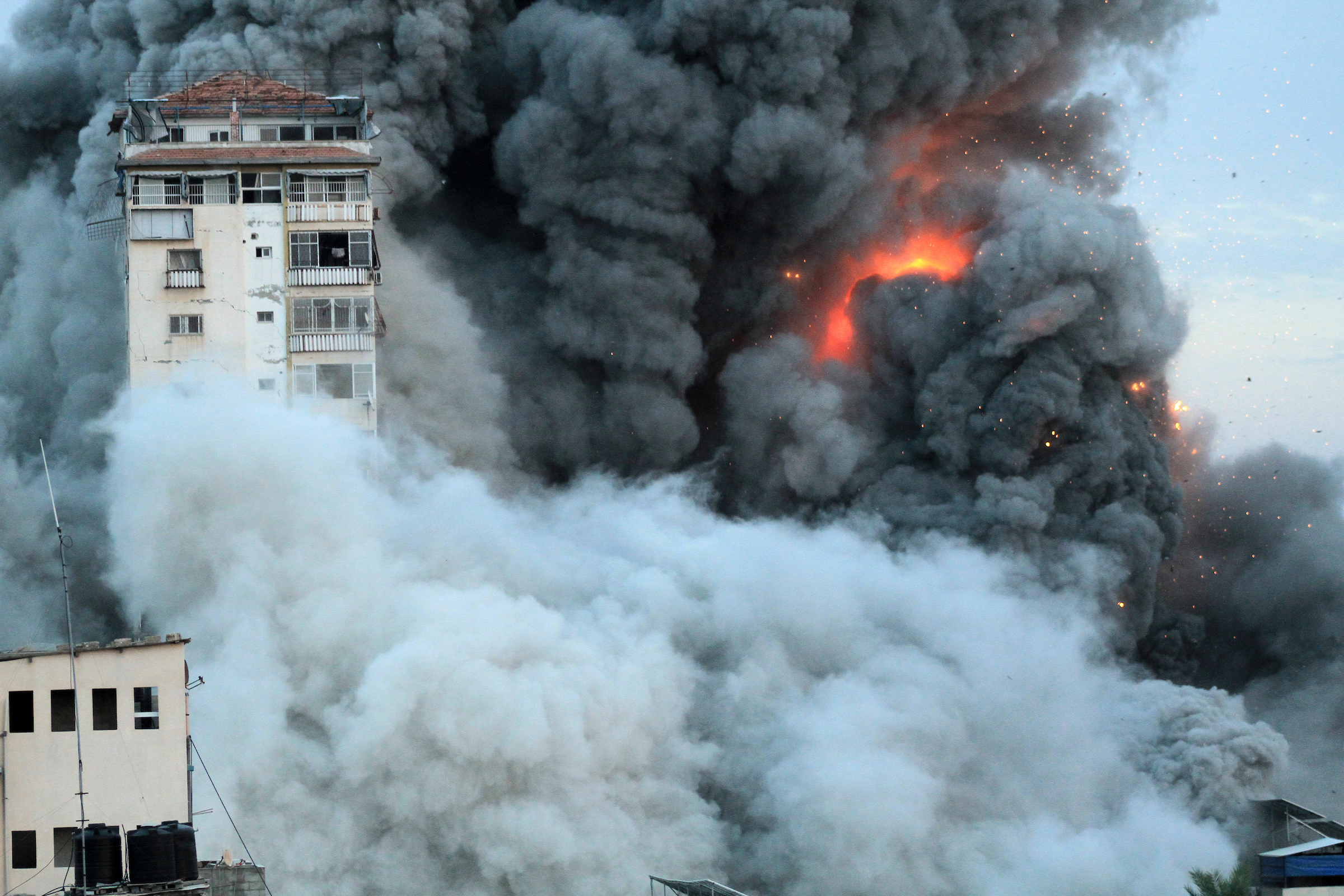
Highrise residential building ″Palestine Tower″ in Gaza following an Israeli strike during the Gaza war.

In 2022, 81.5% of people in Gaza lived in poverty. In recent years, Israel has permitted thousands of Gaza Palestinians to work within its borders. In 2021, 7,000 Gazans held Israeli work or trade permits. In 2022, the permit quota was raised to 17,000, with a planned increase to 20,000. Defense officials stated that granting more work permits would bring more income into Gaza and encourage stability.

The war in Gaza has had a severe impact on the region's economy. Estimates indicate that the unemployment rate has reached approximately 80 percent, resulting in over 250,000 workers losing their jobs. Poverty rates have risen to more than 93 percent, and over 75 percent of the population is experiencing severe food insecurity. Many workers who previously held occupations such as bakers or accountants have been compelled to take on menial and hazardous tasks—for example, clearing rubble—for less than $27 per day, an income that does not meet the basic needs of their large families living in refugee camps.

== Sectors ==
=== Agriculture ===
The major agricultural products are strawberries, citrus, dates, olives, flowers, and various vegetables. Pollution and massive population pressure on water have reduced the productive capacity of the surrounding farms.

=== Manufacturing ===
Small-scale industries in Gaza City include the production of plastics, construction materials, textiles, furniture, pottery, tiles, copperware, and carpets. Following the Oslo Accords, thousands of residents were employed in the various government ministries and security services, while others were employed by the UNRWA and other international organizations that support the development of the city. Gaza City contains some minor industries, including textile production and food processing. A variety of wares are sold in Gaza's street bazaars, including carpets, pottery, wicker furniture, and cotton clothing.

=== Tourism ===
There are several hotels in Gaza including the hotel at the Gaza Museum of Archaeology and the Palestine, Adam, al-Amal, al-Quds, Cliff, and Marna House hotels. All, except the Palestine Hotel, are located along the coast. The United Nations (UN) has a beach club on the same street. Gaza is not a frequent destination of tourists, and most foreigners who stay in hotels are journalists, aid workers, UN and Red Cross personnel. Al-Quds Hotel is known as the "poshest" hotel in the city. The upscale Roots Club is among the nicest of several new restaurants in Gaza.

In 2010 Gaza experienced a boom in the construction of for-profit recreational facilities serving the local population, including the many employees of international aid organizations. Some of the new amusement parks and restaurants are Hamas business ventures. The many new leisure facilities include the Crazy Water Park, the Al-Bustan resort (Gaza), the Bisan City tourist village, and Gaza Mall. Among the many new restaurants are the Roots Club, the Faisal Equestrian Club and the new restaurant at the Gaza Museum of Archaeology. The luxury Blue Beach Resort, Gaza opened in 2015. The Crazy Water Park was burned down a few months after it was built, and the Bisan City tourist village was damaged so much by Israeli shelling in 2014 that they had to send animals to Jordan for safe-keeping.

=== Utilities ===
Providing the population of the Gaza Strip with a 24/7 power supply requires about 600 megawatts of electricity. Yet the Gaza Strip receives only 180 megawatts — 120 directly from Israel via 10 power lines, and 60 generated by Gaza's power plant with Qatari-funded fuel provided by Israel. As a result, residents usually receive power in eight-hour rotations: eight hours on and eight hours off. In summer, the power can go off for up to 12 hours. Bombing the power plant 14 years ago and preventing its rehabilitation since has limited its capacity to generate electricity. In addition, Israel hampers vital repairs and upgrades to the power system and forces the authorities to buy fuel from Israel alone.

== Israeli policies and their impact ==
Former deputy mayor of Jerusalem, Meron Benvenisti, described Israeli policy in the occupied territories as motivated primarily by the notion that Palestinian claims to economic and political rights are illegitimate. He described the economic policies as stifling Palestinian economic development with the primary goal of prohibiting the establishment of a Palestinian state. Political economist Sara Roy, the leading authority on the economy of the Gaza Strip, describes Israeli policies in Gaza as policies of "de-development," which are specifically designed to destroy an economy and ensure that there can be no economic base to support local, independent development and growth. Roy explained that the framework for Israeli policy established between 1967 and 1973 would not change, even with the limited self-rule introduced by the Oslo Accords in the 1990s, but would grow dramatically more draconian in the early 2000s.

=== Access to resources ===
Given the economy's heavy reliance on agriculture, access to water is fundamental for Gaza's development. While under military governance, Israeli policy consistently reduced the amount of water available for consumption by Palestinians in Gaza and has specifically not contributed to improving the quality or quantity of water that is available. Access to water was subject to Israeli priorities, which is highlighted by the water consumption of Gaza's Palestinian population compared to its Jewish settler population; in 1986, annual water consumption among Palestinians was 142 cubic meters per year, compared to over 2,000 cubic meters per year for the Jewish settlers. Palestinians were subject to strict water consumption quotas and were prohibited from establishing new water sources under military order 158; this restriction did not apply to Jews.

Sewage and wastewater systems were (and remain) wholly inadequate, with 80% of towns and villages having systems that empty into pits and often overflow onto roadways and into homes, particularly in densely populated refugee camps where conditions are the worst. Estimates from Israeli planners indicated that the issue of water quality and availability would be dramatically improved given appropriate investment in wastewater management. However, development was subject to the priorities of the Israeli government. For example, over ten years after the planned construction of five sewage treatment facilities, only a single facility had been completed, with two canceled entirely due to planned settlement activity. Similarly, the construction of a main sewage pipeline was prohibited since it did not fit in with Israeli plans (which the Israeli administration refused to make public).

Despite the worsening living conditions in Gaza, the Israeli government continued to invest minimally throughout the military government's rule. This was the case even though 70% of the budget came from taxes imposed in Gaza, with the rest primarily funded by wage deductions from Palestinian workers in Israel. Industry, housing, and water received no development budget at all between 1983 and 1987, with the entire development budget amounting to less than the total spend on the police force in Gaza. Only 0.1% of the development budget was allocated to professional development and 0.4% to housing. The Gaza budget did not impose any financial burden on Israeli taxpayers, despite statements from Israeli officials that limited investment was due to financial constraints. From the 1970s and throughout the duration of the Israeli military government's authority, income tax deductions from Palestinians in Gaza have exceeded Israeli expenditure, resulting in a net transfer of money from Gaza into Israel.

By 1990, Israel had seized control over 58% of the area of the Gaza Strip for the exclusive use of Jewish settlers and the Israeli government. Land use mirrored water use and budget allocation, with 85 times as many people per dunam among Palestinians in the Strip compared to Jews in 1993. The Jewish population was 0.5% of the total Gaza population but was allocated more than 25% of the land in Gaza. The population density in the refugee camps was almost 200,000 people per square mile by 1993, compared to Hong Kong's 14,000 per square mile. Gaza's housing crisis further exacerbates the effects of its high population density. The Israeli military government adopted a single housing program during its authority, which came in the form of a refugee resettlement program. This program was driven primarily by political needs rather than humanitarian and economic ones. Specifically, the program required a refugee who participated to submit a written statement renouncing their status as a refugee. It also required them to demolish their camp shelter, which would then become state property and sometimes used as outposts by the Israeli military. The program's political nature is underscored by the fact that refugees were frequently resettled in areas close to, or even within, refugee camps, where living conditions were nearly identical to those in the camps. Ultimately, the program did not lead to an improvement in overcrowdedness in the camps. Roy observes: "The idea of placing more land at the disposal of the Arab population in order to avoid such a zero-sum outcome appears not to have been considered."

=== Orientation of the economy ===
Israeli economic policies in Gaza tied long-term development directly to conditions and interests in Israel rather than to productive domestic structural reform and development. With reduced access to its own resources, Gaza's economy grew increasingly dependent on external sources of income. Israeli policies under the authority of the military government exacerbated dependence while externalizing (or reorienting) the economy towards Israeli priorities. This reorientation of the economy included shifting the labor force away from developing domestic agriculture and industry towards labor-intensive subcontracting jobs supporting Israeli industry in addition to unskilled labor jobs in Israel itself. Notably, white-collar roles in public services (with the exception of services such as street cleaning) were barred. Israeli efforts to expand employment within Gaza were largely through relief works, as a purely income-generating project that does not contribute to development. The Israeli military government's expenditure on industry in the Gaza Strip between 1984 and 1986 was 0.3% of the total budget, with the development of industry receiving no investment at all.

The result was the continuous transfer of local resources out of Gaza's economy and the increased vulnerability of the economy to external conditions such as Israeli market needs, but most vividly seen by the impacts of the current Israeli blockade and Israel's destructive military campaigns in Gaza. The economy's extreme dependence on Israel during this period is highlighted by the fact that by 1987, 60% of Gaza's GNP came from external payments, primarily through employment in Israel. Israeli policies also undercut any potential competition from Gazan products through generous subsidies to Israeli agriculture. Further, Israel banned exports to all Western markets, and enterprises that might compete with Israeli counterparts suffered as a result of the military authority's regulation. For example, permits from military authorities (which could take five years or longer to acquire) were required in order to plant new citrus trees or replace old ones, and farmers were prohibited from clearing their own land without permission. In addition, military authorities constrained fishing areas to prevent any threat of competition with Israeli products. Even juice and vegetable processing factories (which could make productive use of crop surpluses) were prohibited by the Israeli government until 1992. As Sara Roy describes, Gazan "[e]conomic activity is determined by state policies, not market dynamics."

=== Development of institutions ===
Israeli policies in Gaza also restricted and undermined institutions that could support and plan for productive investment and economic development. Permission from Israeli military authorities was required, for example, for the development of any new programs and even for personnel change. Permission was also required to hold a meeting of three or more people. From the start of the occupation until 1994, municipalities did not have authority over, for example, water and electricity allocation, public markets, public health, and transportation. Decision-making and the initiation of new projects required the approval of the military governor. Even under the Oslo agreement, Israel maintains authority over zoning and land use. Further, municipal governments had no authority to generate revenue. Specifically, they could not introduce taxes or fees without approval from Israeli authorities. Accordingly, municipalities and local institutions often relied on donations from external sources, although access to the funds was often denied even after they had been deposited in Israeli banks. At the start of the occupation, the military government closed all Arab banks in the occupied territories. Branches of Israeli banks were allowed to transfer funds and provide services for importing and exporting businesses. Further, no banks were allowed to supply long-term credit, which seriously limited the potential for economic development.

== See also ==
- Blockade of the Gaza Strip
- Bank of Palestine
