= Palestinian tunnels =

Palestinian tunnels may refer to:

- Gaza Strip smuggling tunnels, passages along the border between Gaza Strip and Egypt
- Palestinian tunnel warfare in the Gaza Strip, military tunnels employed by the Palestinians in their warfare against Israel
