= Crazy Water Park =

Water park in the Gaza Strip, Palestine

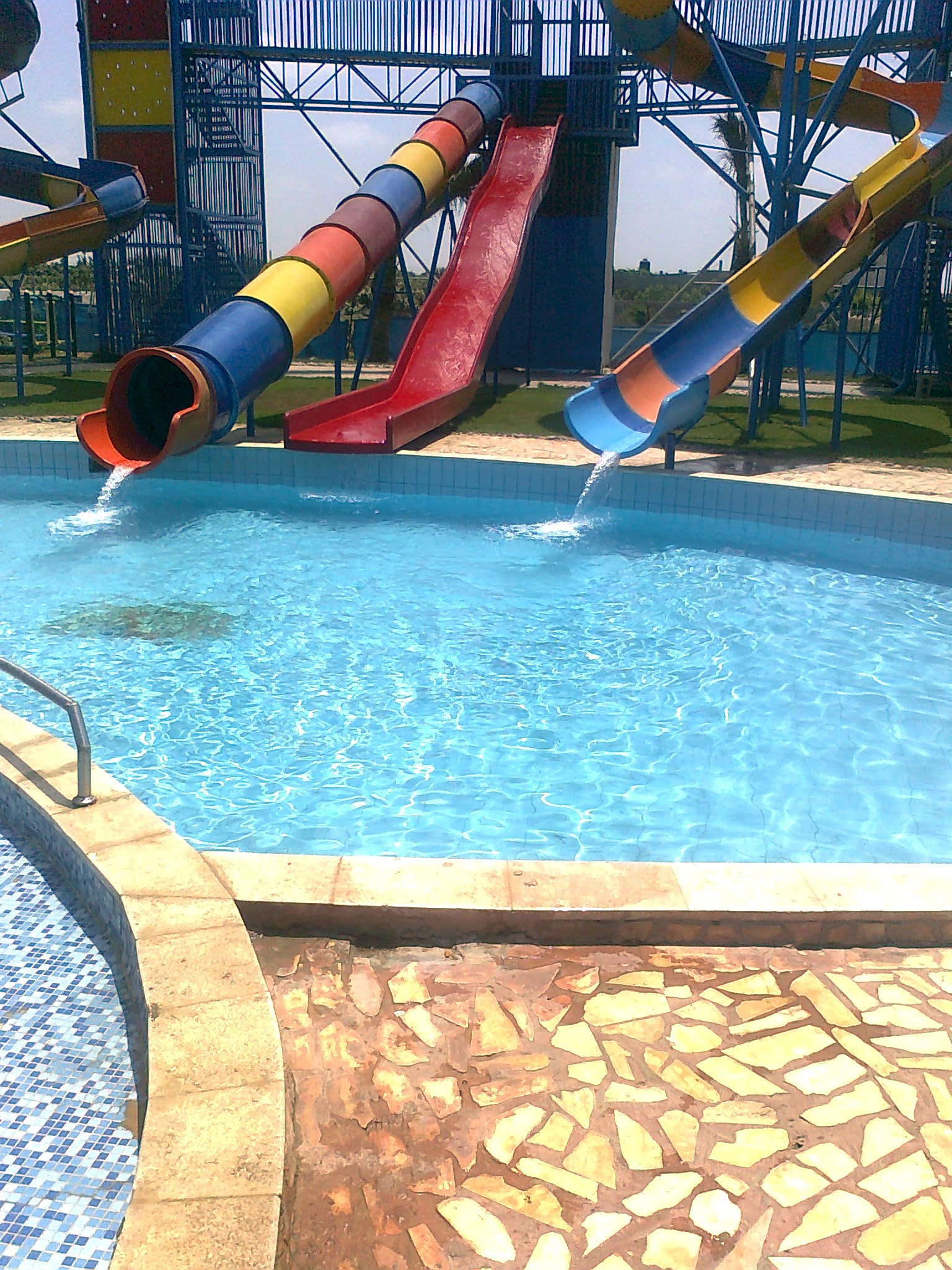
- Crazy Water Park
- Location: Gaza Strip, Palestine
- Opened: May 2010
- Closed: September 2010
- Pools: 3 pools
- Water slides: 3 water slides

Crazy Water Aqua Fun Park was a water park in the Gaza Strip, Palestine. The park opened in May 2010 and was burned down by masked men in September 2010, after being closed by the Palestinian Hamas de facto government for allowing men and women to mingle. In July, one Australian newspaper called it "the new sensation" among Gaza's "privileged."

Mohammed Al-Araj, a former economics minister for the Hamas de facto government in the Gaza Strip, was one of the owners of the park. Two thousand families visited the Crazy Water Park during the first four days that it was open.

== Features ==
The landscaped water park, west of Gaza City, featured 3 swimming pools, a canal 100 meters (300') long, three water slides, ponds with pedalos, a restaurant, a cafe, and a quiet area shaded by a tent where adults could sit on carpets and listen to music. The atmosphere was secular, with popular secular tunes playing over the loudspeakers and women in international-style clothing. A lifting of the government ban on women smoking in public made it legal for women to smoke the popular nargilas at the Park's cafe. The park was built with materials assembled from war-torn buildings as well as materials brought through the Gaza Strip smuggling tunnels. Construction was completed in six months. Admission was 10 shekels, the equivalent of about $2.60 (£ 2.13) as of mid-2010, but using the water slide costs another 5 shekels, and going into the pool costs an extra 20 shekels.

The park cost $2 million to build. According to Ayman Barawi, the Park's financial manager, "This park is a form of escape. People need a chance to escape from the stress. We brought 'air' to the people." According to The Guardian, the water park was part of an entertainment "circuit" for wealthy Palestinians in Gaza, which includes seaside cafes, browsing at the Gaza Mall and riding at the Faisal Equestrian Club, adjacent to the Park.

The Park had 106 employees, not counting about 80 vendors supplying services and goods such as food. Park employees earned the equivalent of between $250 and $300 a month, considered a good wage in Gaza, where over 80% of the population received welfare payments from the United Nations Relief and Works Agency for Palestine Refugees in the Near East and other international aid agencies.

=== Financial backing ===
According to The Jerusalem Post, Crazy Water Park was one of a number of seaside tourist resorts constructed in a $20 million building binge. Some regard the Crazy Water Park as one of a group of Hamas business ventures operating since the late 2000s. According to the Reuters, the resort was built by a "Hamas-linked charity," According to Egyptian journalist Ashraf Abu Al-Houl writing in Al-Ahram Weekly, the park was one among a rapidly growing group of Gaza leisure parks, including Zahrat al-Madain, the Al-Bustan resort and the Bisan City tourist village, so many of which were completed between his visit to Gaza in February 2010 and his return in July 2010 as to make Gaza "almost unrecognizable."

He continued, "a sense of absolute prosperity prevails, as manifested by the grand resorts along and near Gaza's coast. Further, the sight of the merchandise and luxuries filling the Gaza shops amazed me. Merchandise is sold more cheaply than in Egypt, although most of it is from the Egyptian market, and there are added shipping costs and costs for smuggling it via the tunnels—so that it could be expected to be more expensive.... the siege was broken even before Israel's crime against the ships of the Freedom Flotilla in late May; everything already was coming into the Gaza Strip from Egypt. If this weren't the case, businessmen would not have been able to build so many resorts in under four months".

== Hamas sanctions ==
In August 2010, Hamas authorities closed the water park for three days as a "warning" to the management against allowing men and women to mingle at parties. In early September, they shut down the park again for 21 days, along with other resorts and a horse riding club.

== Criticism ==
Residents of Gaza criticized the government for not backing investment in housing instead of water parks. One man, interviewed while relaxing at the park, told a reporter that the money invested into its construction could've been used to house 10 buildings that could've housed 100 families.

== Arson ==
On 19 September 2010, the water park was burned down by a group of about 40 masked individuals in a move that was seen by human rights groups as part of the increasing Islamization of Gaza. Ala al-Araj, one of the owners and a former Hamas government minister, said that at about 3 AM, the men tied up the guards, blindfolded them and beat them. They then set fire to an administrative building; the fire engulfed the park's three-story restaurant and cafeteria, causing extensive damage. The men also dumped gasoline around the plastic slides and torched them.

The identity of the arsonists was not immediately known, but al-Araj noted that "all tourism projects in Gaza are threatened by extremists who reject them" and held the Hamas administration responsible because it had closed the resort. Since seizing control of the Gaza Strip in 2007 after a violent conflict with rival Palestinian group Fatah, Hamas had been closing down restaurants, coffee shops and hotels in the territory, claiming these places violate Islamic tradition. During the same period, other extreme Islamist groups carried out numerous attacks on establishments perceived as un-Islamic, including coffee shops, beauty salons and even UN-run summer camps.

A spokesman for the Hamas interior ministry said it had opened an investigation, and denied a connection between the attack and the closure.

== See also ==
- Islamist anti-Hamas groups in the Gaza Strip
- List of water parks
- Economy of Gaza
- Islamism in the Gaza Strip
- Committee for the Propagation of Virtue and the Prevention of Vice (Gaza Strip)
