= Unknown Soldier's Square =

Square in Gaza City, Palestine

Coordinates: 31°31′09.75″N 34°26′40.72″E

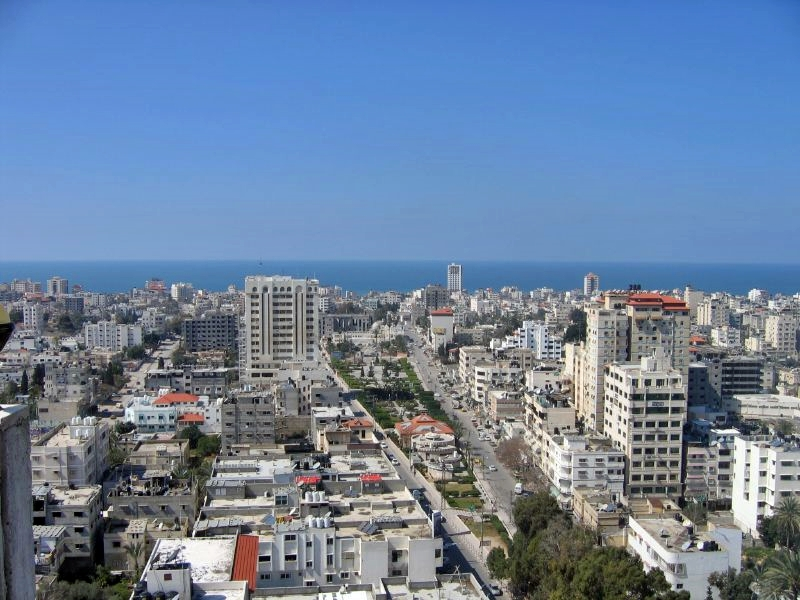
The square seen from the south east in 2006

Soldier's Square or Square of the Unknown Soldier (Arabic: ميدان الجندي المجهول Midan al-Jundi al-Majhool) is a city square in Gaza City, State of Palestine, situated along Omar Mukhtar Street in the Rimal district. It used to be a large public garden popular with unemployed Gazans during the day and promenading families in the evenings. During the Gaza war, Israeli forces used bulldozers to flatten the square. The square is now a stretch of brown dirt, the trees have been uprooted, and the playground has been destroyed.

== History ==
Soldier's Square receives its name from an unknown native Palestinian Arab soldier (feda'i) who died during the 1948 Arab-Israeli War and was buried at the site. The square was built by the Egyptian Army. Prior to Israel's occupation of Gaza in 1967, the center of the site bore a statue pointing north to the rest of Palestine commemorating the soldier. It was pulled down by Israeli authorities and until the 1990s, Soldier's Square was a patch of sand with a white plinth (remnant of the statue) in the center. A public garden was later developed at the site with financial help from Norway, along with a coffeehouse serving visitors to the square. On January 19, 2023, Palestinians gathered in the square to celebrate the release of Maher Younis, a militant who was imprisoned by Israel for 40 years for being part of the then banned Fatah movement and killing an Israeli soldier. After Israeli forces bulldozed the park during the Gaza war, the park has become a refugee camp, for Palestinian people who were displaced as a result of Israeli bombing of the Gaza Strip.

== Bibliography ==
- Winter, David (2000), Israel Handbook: With the Palestinian Authority Areas, Footprint Travel Guides, ISBN 978-1-900949-48-4
- Jacobs, Daniel (1998), Israel and the Palestinian territories, Rough Guides, ISBN 978-0-8021-4350-1
