= Al-Bustan resort =

Resort in Gaza Strip, Palestine

- منتجع البستان

General information
- Location: Gaza City, Palestine
- Opened: 2010; 16 years ago

Al-Bustan (Arabic: منتجع البستان, lit. 'The Garden Resort') is a beach resort in Gaza, Palestine. It was built in 2010 on an area of about 15 dunams and is located north of Gaza City, on the shore of the Mediterranean Sea.

Its features include a restaurant, an artificial pier, playgrounds, a promenade, a fish farm, a prayer area, and a large swimming pool. According to Al Jazeera, it employs 60 people and produces over 50 tons of fish per year. An estimated 800 to 1,000 people visit on a typical day, and about 2,000 on weekends.

The atmosphere has been described as "Islamic"; women wear face and body coverings and only Islamic music is played.

Abdul Rahim Shihab was the resort's general supervisor in 2012.

According to Reuters, the resort was built by a "Hamas-linked charity". Al Jazeera also said that the resort is run by "an Islamic association close to the Hamas movement". The ceremonies were attended by Fathi Hamad, the Interior Minister of the Hamas-led government, and other Hamas-affiliated elected members of the Palestinian Legislative Council. According to The Independent, "There is a widespread assumption in Gaza that Hamas... or at least businessmen close to the Islamic faction, are behind the venture." Reuters reported that Taher al-Nono, a spokesperson for Hamas, "declined to confirm any official ties" (or funding) given to resorts other than the Bisan City tourist village.

According to Egyptian journalist Ashraf Abu Al-Houl, writing in Al-Ahram, Al-Bustan is one of a rapidly growing group of Gaza pleasure parks, including Zahrat Al-Madain and the Crazy Water Park, many of which were completed between his visit to Gaza in February and his return in July 2010 as to make Gaza "almost unrecognizable." He continues, "A sense of absolute prosperity prevails, as manifested by the grand resorts along and near Gaza's coast. Further, the sight of the merchandise and luxuries filling the Gaza shops amazed me. Merchandise is sold more cheaply than in Egypt, although most of it is from the Egyptian market, and there are added shipping costs and costs for smuggling it via the tunnels – so that it could be expected to be more expensive... the siege was broken even before Israel's crime against the ships of the Freedom Flotilla in late May; everything already was coming into the Gaza Strip from Egypt. If this weren't the case, businessmen would not have been able to build so many resorts in under four months."

According to Reuters, the resort is part of a "construction boom" in "recreational facilities" that has prompted some to criticize Hamas for putting money into entertainment venues like Al-Bustan and the Crazy Water Park rather than into housing and infrastructure.

The resort has hosted events for orphaned and disabled children.

== See also ==
- Economy of the Gaza Strip
- List of hotels in Palestine
- Tourism in Palestine
