= Al-Andalusia mall =

Three-story shopping mall in Gaza City, Palestine

Coordinates: 31.5167°N 34.4500°E

Al-Andalusia mall (Arabic: الأندلسية مول) is a three-story shopping mall in Gaza City, Palestine. It was the city's second indoor mall and opened in July 2011. The mall is located just west of Gaza City near Haidar Abdel Shafi Square.

== History ==
The $4 million mall has 14 departments. It was the city's second indoor mall and opened in July 2011. Construction began in August 2010 on the 3,000 square meter shopping complex housing a cinema, restaurants, retail shops, supermarket, and swimming pool. At the time of its opening, it was the biggest mall in the Gaza Strip.

== Other shopping malls ==
Gaza's first shopping mall, Gaza Mall, opened in July 2010. Gaza's third and largest mall (as of 2017) is Capital Mall, which opened in 2017.

== See also ==
- Economy of Gaza City
