= Committee for the Propagation of Virtue and the Prevention of Vice (Gaza Strip) =

Islamic religious police in the Gaza Strip

- هيئة الأمر بالمعروف والنهي عن المنكر
- Official emblem of Hamas

Agency overview
- Formed: 2007; 19 years ago
- Type: Islamic religious police enforcing traditional Muslim codes of behavior (Sharia)
- Jurisdiction: Gaza Strip, Palestine
- Headquarters: Gaza City
- Parent department: Hamas Ministry of the Waqf (Islamic endowment)

The Committee for the Propagation of Virtue and the Prevention of Vice (Arabic: هيئة الأمر بالمعروف والنهي عن المنكر hayʾa al-ʾamr bil-maʿrūf wan-nahī ʿan al-munkar) is a group in the Palestinian territory of Gaza Strip, responsible for enforcing traditional Muslim codes of behavior (Sharia). According to journalist Khaled Abu Toameh and Middle East researcher Dr. Jonathan Spyer, the group forms part of the police forces of the Hamas de facto government.

In 2009, the Hamas government's "Islamic Endowment Ministry" deployed Virtue Committee members to warn citizens of the alleged "dangers" of immodest dress, card playing, and dating.

The force was aimed to "fight those who are being corrupted by Satan, and do not observe sharia law."

== Overview ==
The Committee for the Propagation of Virtue and Prevention of Vice was mentioned in a 2007 report on Al-Arabiya. They were described as an "unknown" group that have released a statement declaring a campaign to hunt down all, "slaves of the devil who commit blasphemy and roam the streets". Their statement called upon youth to resist temptation from the devil as, "the devil's path leads to perdition ... Young people are our main target since they commit many transgressions whether name calling that involves God or through hanging out late at night in the streets, smoking and disturbing people." The group also claimed responsibility for severely beating up two members of a Khan Younis clan, "for committing sins such as disrespect for God and disturbing people ... That was a warning for them. Hopefully, they will come to their senses." Citing a report in Al-Quds Al-Arabi, Al-Arabiya said one of the first acts of the group was to beat up a singer in Gaza after he gave a concert in Khan Younis. Al-Arabiya noted that "There was no official comment from Hamas leaders on the acts or declarations of Gaza's self-styled religious police."

=== Detention of Asma al-Ghul ===
In 2009, The Jerusalem Post reported that the Committee is a police force that operates under the command of the Hamas Ministry of the Waqf (Islamic Endowment), and includes dozens of plainclothes police officers who patrol public places such as beaches, parks, restaurants, hair salons and cafes to ensure that males and females are not mixing together and that the women are dressed modestly. A special all-female unit within the force is said to number 100-150 officers who enforce female modesty and handle female suspects, with uniforms that include a niqab and gloves, "with only an eye slit visible". Citing unnamed local Gaza reporters, the newspaper states that the Hamas de facto government has not publicly acknowledged the force's existence because it fears being branded fundamentalist.

Another incident attributed to the group by The Jerusalem Post concerns Asma al-Ghul, a female Palestinian journalist, who stated that policemen from the force "...accused me of laughing loudly while swimming with my friend and failing to wear a hijab...They also wanted to know the identity of the people who were with me at the beach and whether they were relatives of mine".

Al-Ghul added that the officers confiscated her passport, and that she had received death threats from anonymous callers following the incident. Regarding the incident, "Hamas security commanders initially said that [al-Ghul] and her friends were stopped because they were having a mixed party at the beach. Later, one of the commanders said that al-Ghul was stopped [for] not wearing a hijab while swimming. Another commander claimed" that the offense was "smoking nargilas and partying in a public place". The Guardian reported the same incident also citing al-Ghul, but attributing it only to "Hamas police". Their report noted that Islam Shahwan, the Hamas police spokesman, denied it ever happened.

== See also ==
- Enjoining what is right and forbidding what is wrong (Promotion of Virtue and Prevention of Vice)
- Committee for the Propagation of Virtue and the Prevention of Vice (Afghanistan)
- Committee for the Promotion of Virtue and the Prevention of Vice (Saudi Arabia); also known as Mutaween
- Guidance Patrol, Iran's morality police
- Muslim patrols, East London Muslim vigilantes in 2013–2014
- Islamic religious police
- Islamism in the Gaza Strip
- Public morality
- Talibanization
