= Blue Beach Resort, Gaza =

Resort in Gaza Strip, Palestine

Blue Beach Resort
- Location within Gaza City

General information
- Location: Gaza, Palestine
- Coordinates: 31.5458°N 34.45388°E
- Opening: 2015
- Closed: 2024 (destroyed)

The Blue Beach Resort was a luxury beach resort hotel in Gaza, Palestine that was opened in the summer of 2015.

The hotel featured cabana boys serving clients on its private beach, and an Olympic-size swimming pool. Guests stayed in 162 "chalet-style" rooms set in landscaped grounds with views of the Mediterranean. It was part of the entertainment district along Al-Rashid Street in Gaza City that featured "dozens of new and modern resorts, chalets and coffee shops," other neighborhoods also had upscale shopping malls, apartment buildings, and entertainment venues.

Blue Beach joined the five-star hotel Mashtal, built in 2011, at the high end of the Gaza luxury hotel market.

The Washington Post described the hotel as one of a number of luxury businesses catering to wealthy Gazans. According to economic analyst Nizar Sha’ban, “Most foreigners who visit the Strip and stay in its hotels are journalists, aid workers, UN and Red Cross staff."

The Blue Beach resort hotel was built on the basis of an agreement signed with the Palestinian Ministry of Housing, based on the Build-Operate-Transfer (BOT) method. The agreement states that the Palestine Real Estate Investment Company (PRICO) is both the developer and the operator of the hotel for 49 years, with an option to renew for another identical period, after which the property is transferred to the authorities.

During the Gaza war, dozens of Hamas militants fired anti-tank missiles at the Israeli forces from the hotel premises and its guest rooms, according to the Israel Defense Forces. Some of the Hamas militants were said to have been killed. During the battle, the IDF claimed having discovered an underground infrastructure, which included seven shafts that led to tunnels, and inside of it the living rooms of Hamas militants. Many weapons were also found, including Kalashnikov rifles, various charges, and drones. In addition, video footage was brought as proof that access to several tunnels was available from many guest corridors in the hotel.

== See also ==
- Tourism in the Palestinian territories
- Al Deira Hotel
- Al-Andalusia mall
