= Gaza Mall =

Shopping mall in Gaza, Palestine

Coordinates: 31°31′11.86″N 34°26′53″E

The Gaza Mall (Arabic: مركز غزة للتسويق) is Gaza’s first shopping mall. It opened in Gaza City, Palestine, on 17 July 2010.

The air-conditioned, indoor shopping venue in the Rimal neighborhood of Gaza extends over 1,800 square metres (19,000 sq ft) There are two floors with shops offering international brands. The Independent reported that the mall was built at a cost of $1.5 million, while Agence France-Presse reported $3 million.

== Shopping ==
Salah a-Din Abu Abdo, chair of the mall's board of directors, promised "attractive and competitive prices" in an effort to replace Gaza's traditional open air markets with a comfortable, air-conditioned shopping experience. His goal is to "develop a marketing and leisure culture" among Gazans.

The mall features a pharmacy, separate prayer rooms for men and women and stores selling shoes, toys, clothing, and office supplies. A supermarket, children's play area, and restaurant are planned but were not operating in time for the grand opening.

According to CBS News, construction materials and concrete were brought in via the Gaza Strip smuggling tunnels.

== Business model ==
The stores are locally owned and the mall is a private venture, but the grand opening was televised and attended by Abu Osama al-Kurd, the Hamas government Minister of Labor. All of the sales clerks are employed directly by the mall, and all of the shops use the same shopping bags imprinted with the mall's logo. 90% of the goods on sale are imported from Israel.

According to The Independent, "There is a widespread assumption in Gaza that Hamas... or at least businessmen close to the Islamic faction, are behind the venture." Hamas denied this and one of the mall's investors, Sarraj Abu Sleem, stated that "The government supports this economic project but the only help it has given us has been to grant us a licence." The Independent quoted a prominent businessman who believes the mall is one of Hamas’ new business ventures that include the Asdar Media Centre (a combined livestock farm and film production company), the Al Bustan Restaurant and Leisure Park, and the Crazy Water Park for children. According to The Guardian, the mall is part of an entertainment "circuit" for wealthy Gazans, which includes seaside cafes, the Crazy Water Park, and the Faisal Equestrian Club.

According to The Independent, observers believe that Hamas is investing in leisure and retail businesses because these will yield a faster return of cash the organization needs to fund its political and military activities. According to Agence France-Presse, "Hamas is also widely believed to be behind (the Gaza Mall)...that opened this week in Gaza City with a ceremony attended by several Hamas ministers and professors at the Hamas-linked Islamic University. The mall’s manager, Siraj Abu Selim, denied Hamas was involved in the $3 million project, but refused to give the names of any of the mall’s owners or chief investors." On 27 August 2010, Al-Arabiya reported that some of the mall's owners are affiliated with Hamas.

== See also ==
- Al-Andalusia mall
- Economy of Gaza
