= Faisal Equestrian Club =

Equestrian club and upscale restaurant in Gaza City, Palestine

- Logo of the club
- Interactive map of Faisal Equestrian Club
- Location: Rimal, Gaza City, Gaza Strip, Palestine
- Coordinates: 31°29′37″N 34°24′42″E

The Faisal Equestrian Club (Arabic: نادي الفيصل للفروسية) is an equestrian club and upscale restaurant in Gaza City, Palestine.

The track is the site of horse races, a "popular sport" in Gaza according to a 1994 article in the Rocky Mountain News. As of July 2010, the club was the sole equestrian club in the Gaza strip. As of 2010, membership was increasing, with some 120 members, and other people coming for occasional lessons or an occasional ride. The club has two tracks, a 40-meter and a 60-meter international standard. There are also different styles of show-jumps. Horses are imported through the Gaza Strip smuggling tunnels.

According to the Australian newspaper The Age, the Club's restaurant is "The place to be seen for Gaza's teenage elite." The Club serves non-alcoholic Bavarian beer to a wealthy, young, secular crowd, among whom "Headscarves are frowned upon." According to The Guardian, the club, which was adjacent to the Crazy Water Park, is part of a recreational "circuit" for wealthy Gazans that includes seaside cafes and the Gaza Mall.
