= Roots Club =

Former restaurant in Gaza City, Gaza Strip, Palestine

Roots Club was an upscale restaurant and catering hall in Gaza, Palestine. In 2010, restaurant reviewers expected the restaurant to bring "a new era of hospitality and dining experience" to Gazans.

The club was located on Cairo Street in the Gaza district of Rimal. It featured three different dining venues: the informal, outdoor Green Terrace Café; the Ambassador catering hall; and the air-conditioned Roots Restaurant. Lonely Planet called the Roots Club, "the best" restaurant in Gaza.

The Israeli Government Press Office was inspired by Tom Gross's dispatch to send an email to journalists reading:

"In anticipation of foreign correspondents traveling to Gaza to cover reports of alleged humanitarian difficulties in the Hamas-run territory, and as part of efforts to facilitate the work of journalists in the region, the Government Press Office is pleased to bring to your attention the attached menu and information for the Roots Club and Restaurant in Gaza... We have been told the beef stroganoff and cream of spinach soup are highly recommended."

== See also ==
- Economy of Gaza
