= Rimal =

Neighborhood in Gaza, Palestine

Rimal حي الرمال
- Neighborhood
- Remal
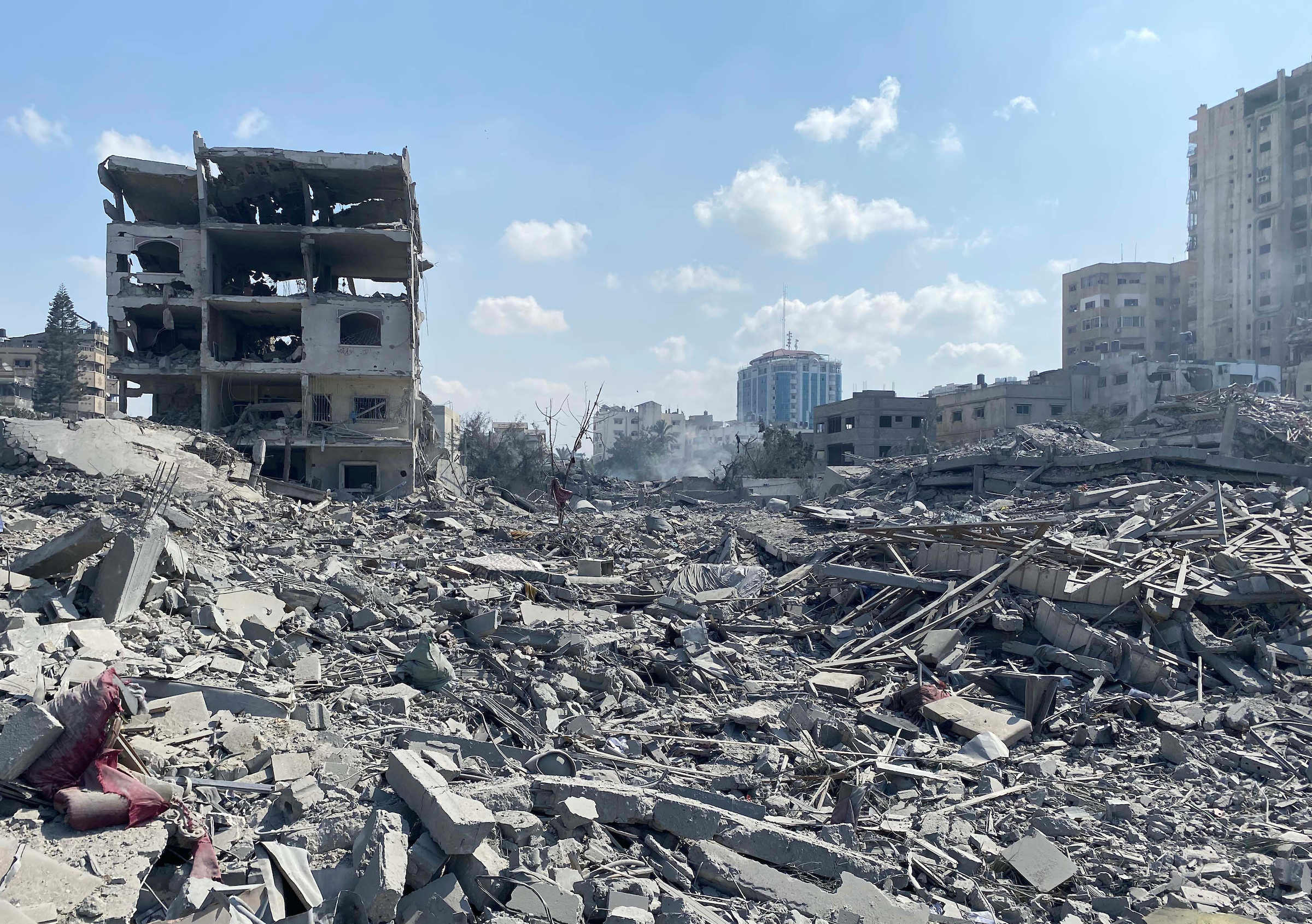
- Israeli airstrike destruction in Rimal, October 9, 2023
- Interactive map of Rimal
- Location in Gaza Strip
- Coordinates: 31°31′12″N 34°26′35″E
- Grid position: 097/103 PAL
- Country: Palestine
- Governorate: Gaza Governorate
- City: Gaza

Government
  - Control: Hamas
- Time zone: UTC+2 (EET)
  - Summer (DST): +3

Rimal or Remal (Arabic: حي الرمال, lit. 'sands') is a neighborhood in Gaza City located three kilometers (two miles) from the city center. Situated along the coastline, it was considered the most prosperous neighborhood of Gaza. The main street that runs through Gaza, Omar Mukhtar Street, runs northwest–southeast in the district and the main coastal road, Ahmad Orabi/Rasheed Street, northeast-southwest. Rimal is divided into the city districts of southern Rimal and northern Rimal. The neighborhood is the site of multiple government ministries and has been severely damaged during the ongoing Gaza war.

== History ==
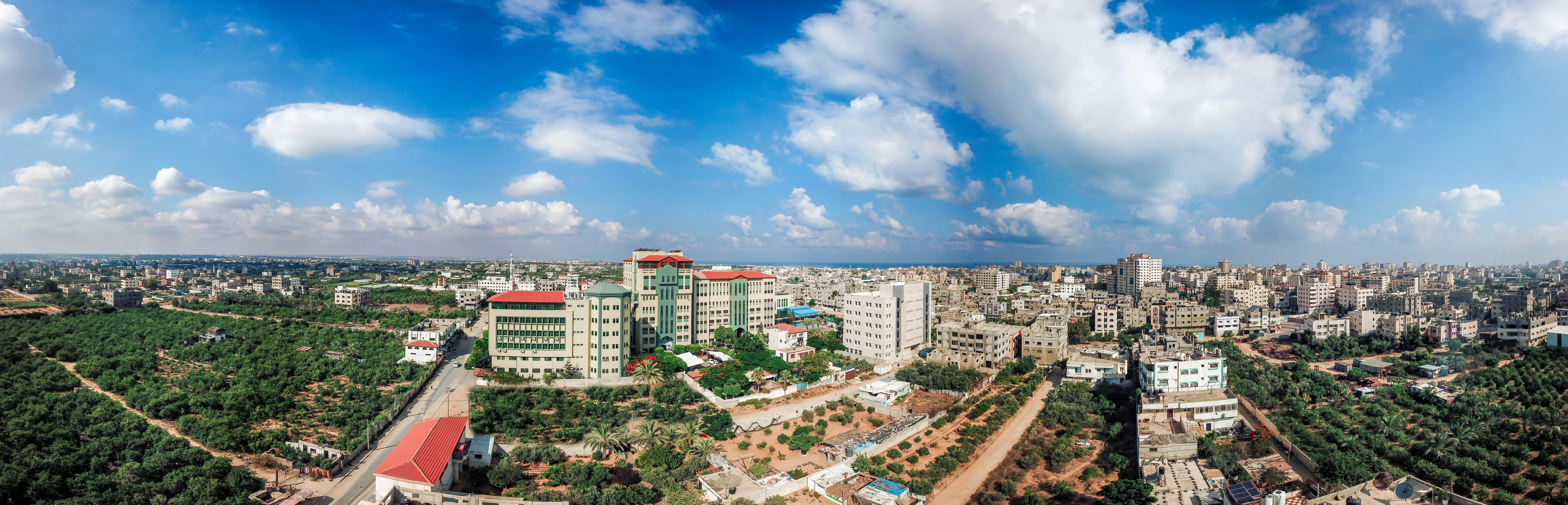
Panorama view of Rimal, 2018

Rimal is built on the ancient port city of Gaza called Maioumas. The intense rivalry between Christian Gaza and Pagan Maioumas continued throughout the Byzantine era, even after the population of Maioumas had been converted to Christianity by Imperial decree and the Pagan sanctuaries destroyed by Porphyry of Gaza. The coastline of Gaza consisted mostly of sand dunes around the bustling Port of Gaza up until the mid-20th century. In the 1930s and 1940s, foreign missionary institutions financed the establishment of a residential neighborhood along the coast. This new district became known as Rimal ("Sand" or "Beach") and today covers most of Gaza City's coastline and much of the area between the coastline and the Old City. Most of the buildings were detached houses built in European style. After the neighborhood's construction, the center of commercial activity shifted from the Old City to Rimal.

== Landmarks ==
Rimal contains the Palestinian Presidential Palace, the Governor's Palace, the Gaza Mall, the Roots Club, the United Nations beach club, the Palestinian Centre for Human Rights, the main al-Shifa Hospital, the Palestinian Legislative Council, and a number of foreign government offices, four hotels, and all of the city's well-known restaurants. The Midan Jundi (Soldier's Square), dedicated to an indigenous Arab soldier who died fighting in the 1948 Arab-Israeli War, is located in Rimal. The port of Gaza is in the Rimal district and home to the Palestinian Naval Police force. Rimal is the lone elite district of the city.

== Bibliography ==
- Abu-Lughod, J.; Dumper, Michael (2007). Cities of the Middle East and North Africa: A Historical Encyclopedia. ABC-CLIO. ISBN 978-1-57607-919-5.
- Balsamo, Franca (2013). Violence Against Women in Difficult Contexts, A Network Between Three Cities: Gaza, Haifa and Torino. University of Torino - CIRSDe. ISBN 9788890555664.
- Butt, Gerald (1995). Life at the crossroads: a history of Gaza. Rimal Publications. ISBN 1-900269-03-1.
- Hevelone-Harper, Jennifer Lee (1997), Disciples of the Desert: Monks, Laity, and Spiritual Authority in Sixth-century Gaza, JHU Press, ISBN 0-8018-8110-2
- Winter, Dave (2000), Israel Handbook: With the Palestinian Authority Areas, Footprint Travel Guides, ISBN 978-1-900949-48-4
- Jacobs, Daniel (1998). Israel and the Palestinian territories. Rough Guides. ISBN 978-1-85828-248-0.
- Sivan, Hagith (2008). Palestine in Late Antiquity. Oxford University Press. ISBN 978-0-19-928417-7.
- Sterk, Andrea (2004). Renouncing the World Yet Leading the Church: The Monk-bishop in Late Antiquity. Harvard University Press. ISBN 0-674-01189-9.
