= Khaled Abu Toameh =

Israeli Arab journalist and documentary filmmaker

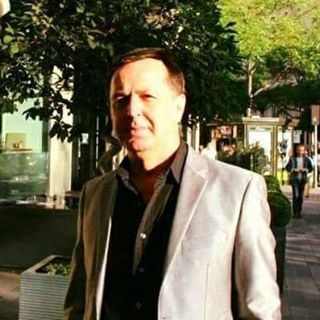
Khaled Abu Toameh

Khaled Abu Toameh (Arabic: خالد أبو طعمة, Hebrew: חאלד אבו טועמה) is an Israeli Arab journalist, lecturer and documentary filmmaker.

Abu Toameh writes for The Jerusalem Post and for the New York–based Gatestone Institute, where he is a senior distinguished fellow. He worked as a producer and consultant for NBC News. His articles have also appeared in numerous newspapers around the world.

== Biography ==
Khaled Abu Toameh was born to an Israeli Arab father and a Palestinian Arab mother. He grew up in the Arab-Israeli town Baqa al-Gharbiyye. He studied English literature at the Hebrew University and lives in Jerusalem.

== Media career ==
Starting in 2002, Khaled Abu Toameh reported for The Jerusalem Post on Arab affairs. He previously worked as a producer and consultant for NBC News. He has produced several documentaries on the Palestinians for the BBC, Channel 4, Australian, Danish and Swedish television.

Abu Toameh has served as a lecturer with the University of Minnesota – School of Journalism and Mass Communication. He has also lectured at the London School of Oriental and African Studies, Northwestern University, California Polytechnic State University and the London-based think tank Chatham House.

He has also contributed to Times of Israel, Commentary, US News and World Report, and AIJAC.

Abu Toameh was invited to speak at the House of Commons of the United Kingdom. Due to his expertise, he's a regular speaker on Palestinian issues in Israel, the US, Canada, Australia and Europe.

== Recognition and awards ==
Abu Toameh received the 2014 Daniel Pearl Award. Abu Toameh shared Israel Media Watch's 2010 award for media criticism with the satirical Israeli website Latma.

On 10 May 2011, Khaled Abu Toameh won the Hudson Institute Award for Courage in Journalism.

Canada's Toronto Sun columnist Salim Mansur praised Abu Toameh for his courage and knowledge of the politics of the Arab world.

Abu Toameh is the 2013 recipient of the Emet award given by the Committee for Accuracy in Middle East Reporting in America (CAMERA).

He was chosen on the Algemeiner Journal's 2013 list of The Top 100 People Positively Influencing Jewish Life.

In 2018, Abu Toameh received the Speaker of Truth Award from the Endowment for Middle East Truth.
