= Bisan City tourist village =

Entertainment complex in Gaza Strip, Palestine

The Bisan City tourist village was a tourism development complex initiated by the Hamas government, located in the northern part of Gaza, Palestine.

The 270 dunam leisure park includes a new wedding hall, gardens, soccer fields, an Olympic-size swimming pool a 19-hectare zoo, playgrounds, and restaurants. 6,000 people are said to visit every weekend; some arrive in buses subsidized for by the government. On arrival, the passengers pay admission fees. It was built on government-owned land at a cost of $1.5 million and is supervised by Fathi Hammad, the Hamas Minister of the Interior.

The tourist village was built by the government on Interior Ministry land formerly used as a garbage dump.

According to Egyptian journalist Ashraf Abu Al-Houl writing in Al-Ahram, the tourist village is one of a rapidly growing group of Gaza pleasure parks, including Zahrat Al-Madain, the Al-Bustan resort, and the Crazy Water Park, so many of which were completed between his visit to Gaza in February 2010 and his return in July 2010 as to make Gaza "almost unrecognizable." He continues, "A sense of absolute prosperity prevails, as manifested by the grand resorts along and near Gaza's coast. Further, the sight of the merchandise and luxuries filling the Gaza shops amazed me. Merchandise is sold more cheaply than in Egypt, although most of it is from the Egyptian market, and there are added shipping costs and costs for smuggling it via the tunnels – so that it could be expected to be more expensive...the siege was broken even before Israel's action against the ships of the Freedom Flotilla in late May; everything already was coming into the Gaza Strip from Egypt. If this weren't the case, businessmen would not have been able to build so many resorts in under four months."

According to Reuters, the resort is part of a "construction boom" in "recreational facilities" that has prompted some to criticize Hamas for putting money into entertainment venues like the tourist village at Bisan City and the Crazy Water Park rather than into housing and infrastructure.
