= Gaza Strip smuggling tunnels =

Smuggling tunnels dug along the Egypt–Gaza border

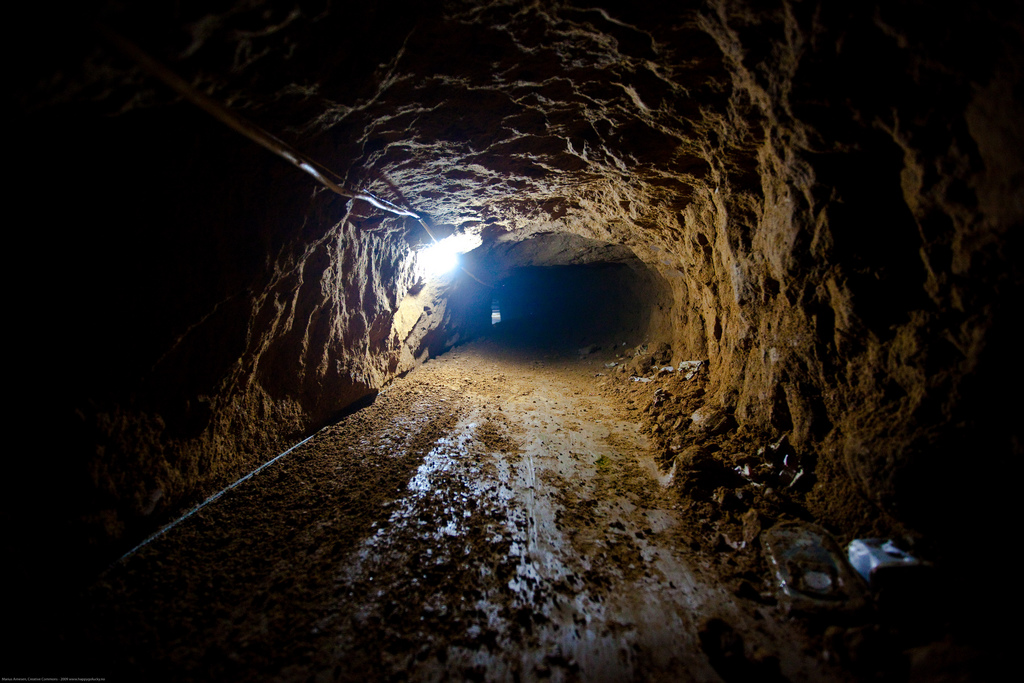
Smuggling tunnel in Rafah, 2009.

The Gaza Strip smuggling tunnels are smuggling tunnels that had been dug under the Philadelphi Route along the Egypt–Gaza border. They were dug to subvert the blockade of the Gaza Strip to smuggle in fuel, food, weapons and other goods into the Gaza Strip. After the Egypt–Israel peace treaty of 1979, the town of Rafah, in the southern Gaza Strip, was split by this buffer zone. One part is located in the southern part of Gaza, and the smaller part of the town is in Egypt. After Israel withdrew from Gaza in 2005, the Philadelphi Corridor was placed under the control of the Palestinian Authority until 2007, when Hamas seized power in 2007, and Egypt and Israel closed their borders with the Gaza Strip.

In 2009, Egypt began the construction of an underground barrier to block existing tunnels and make new ones harder to dig. In 2011, Egypt relaxed restrictions at its border with the Gaza Strip, allowing Palestinians to cross freely. In 2013–2014, Egypt's military destroyed most of the 1,200 smuggling tunnels.

== Background ==
The Gaza Strip smuggling tunnels are tunnels across the Gaza–Egypt border, used to bypass the Rafah Border Crossing, which is used for exceptional cases only, when opened at all. The first recorded discovery of a tunnel by Israel was in 1983, after Israel had withdrawn from the Sinai. The border, redrawn in 1982 after the Egypt–Israel peace treaty, divided Rafah into an Egyptian and a Gazan part. The tunnels used to start from the basements of houses in Rafah on the one side of the border and end in houses in Rafah on the other side.

By September 2005, after withdrawing from the Gaza Strip, Israel declared that Palestinians would not have control of their side of the crossing, and the Rafah crossing should be closed. During the rest of the year Egypt opened and closed the crossing intermittently. In November 2005, two agreements between Israel and the Palestinian Authority permitted the reopening of the crossing with third-party European Union assistance. However, the movement of people were very restricted and goods would use the Kerem Shalom crossing, under the supervision of Israelis and monitored by EU monitors. In 2006, the Rafah crossing was opened to June. During the rest of the year it was open during 31 days at random.

In June 2007, Hamas took over the Gaza Strip. Following the takeover, Egypt and Israel largely sealed their border crossings with Gaza, on the grounds that the Palestinian Authority had fled and was no longer providing security on the Palestinian side. The Karni and Rafah checkpoints were closed again, resulting in "severe personal and economic hardship for Gaza's 1.4 million population", according to OCHA. Thousands of travelers have been stranded on both sides of the border.

The blockade of the Gaza Strip has caused a shortage of certain basic products, especially construction materials, fuel, some consumer articles, and medicines and medical supplies. Import restrictions, including of basic building materials, have led to the proliferation of tunnels under the border with Egypt. As Israel limits the Palestinian freedom of movement, for most Gazans the tunnels are the only way to move from and to Gaza.

== Use ==
The tunnels were used to smuggle a wide range of goods, including fuel, gas, cement, construction materials, raw materials, pesticides, seeds, agricultural tools, preservatives, packaging material, spare parts, livestock, zoo animals, food, medicines, clothes, car parts, building supplies, weapons and luxury items in general. Initially, the tunnels were used for moving consumer goods and medicines. During the First Intifada (December 1987 to 1993), some, more secret, tunnels were said to be used by militant groups to bring in arms and money.

A 2015 report of the United Nations Conference on Trade and Development (UNCTAD) noted that between 2007 and 2013, more than 1,532 tunnels were running under the border to mitigate the impact of the blockade on Gaza. They were closed by mid-2013. The size of the tunnel trade was even greater than the volume of trade through official channels. The tunnels had been essential to recover from the destructions during the 2008/2009 Gaza War. Based on the materials allowed in by Israel, it would have taken 80 years to rebuild the 6,000 housing units destroyed during the military operation. Due to the tunnel imports, it only took five years. Gaza's sole power plant ran on diesel from Egypt brought through the tunnels in the range of 1 million litres per day before June 2013. In 2015, UNCTAD reported that the end of the tunnel economy highlighted an urgent need for the complete and immediate lifting of Israel's blockade on Gaza.

=== Construction materials ===
Israel restricts the importation of construction materials into the strip, to prevent their use for military purposes by Hamas. As a result, cement and other construction materials were some of the main goods smuggled through the tunnels.

=== Fuel ===
Smuggling fuel through the tunnels has been the primary source of fuel for Gaza's only power plant. Electricity is needed for the desalination of drinking water. After Egypt demolished hundreds of tunnels in 2013 and Israel closed the Kerem Shalom Crossing, a shortage in fuel caused the shut down of the power plant.

Increased fuel shortages and high prices, due to the intensified anti-tunnels measures by the Egyptian government under President Abdel Fattah el-Sisi, halted the functioning of sewage treatment facilities in Gaza in 2014. Untreated waste water was pumped into the Gaza shore, causing serious environment pollution and swimming prohibition at the beaches.

=== Transport of people ===
Facing the restriction of the Palestinian freedom of movement, an advanced system of human transport has been established, including the issue of tickets which serve as a travel permit. A travel ticket from and to Gaza may cost between $30 and $300 (2012), depending on the provided service. As of 2012, travelling by car was possible. Travelling through the tunnels was popular during Ramadan in 2012. As travelling through the Israeli crossings is only permitted by exception, and the Rafah Crossing is opened for limited periods, if opened at all, the tunnels have often become the only outlet for the strip's residents.

=== Use of child labor ===
According to an article by Nicolas Pelham in the IPS Journal of Palestine Studies, child labor is employed in the smuggling tunnels with the justification that children are more "nimble." Despite calls from human rights groups for the Gaza government to stop the practice, regulation of child labor is lax.

Benjamin Netanyahu used the IPS publication to document his claim that "Hamas puts children to work in terror tunnels, sending them to their death." The claim was widely used by numerous pro-Israeli media outlets. In a response to Netanyahu, Institute for Palestine Studies recalled that the tunnels were regulated by but largely not owned or operated by Hamas, and were a "response to Israel’s imposition of a draconian blockade that drastically controls and at times has banned almost all goods entering the territory, from construction materials, and gasoline, down to such items as pasta." The response further stated that "Pelham never suggests, as the prime minister seemed to imply in his comments, that children were ever used to build tunnels for military purposes, least of all into Israel", although "Hamas, as the governing authority in Gaza, did not implement its own directives to prevent the use of child labor". The Institute corrected an error in the article: There had not been at least 160 children been killed in the tunnels, according to Hamas officials, but rather 160 persons as of 2012. IPS noted that more than 541 were children and some 3084 wounded by the Israeli bombing in the 2014 Israel–Gaza conflict that was ongoing at the time.

== Construction ==
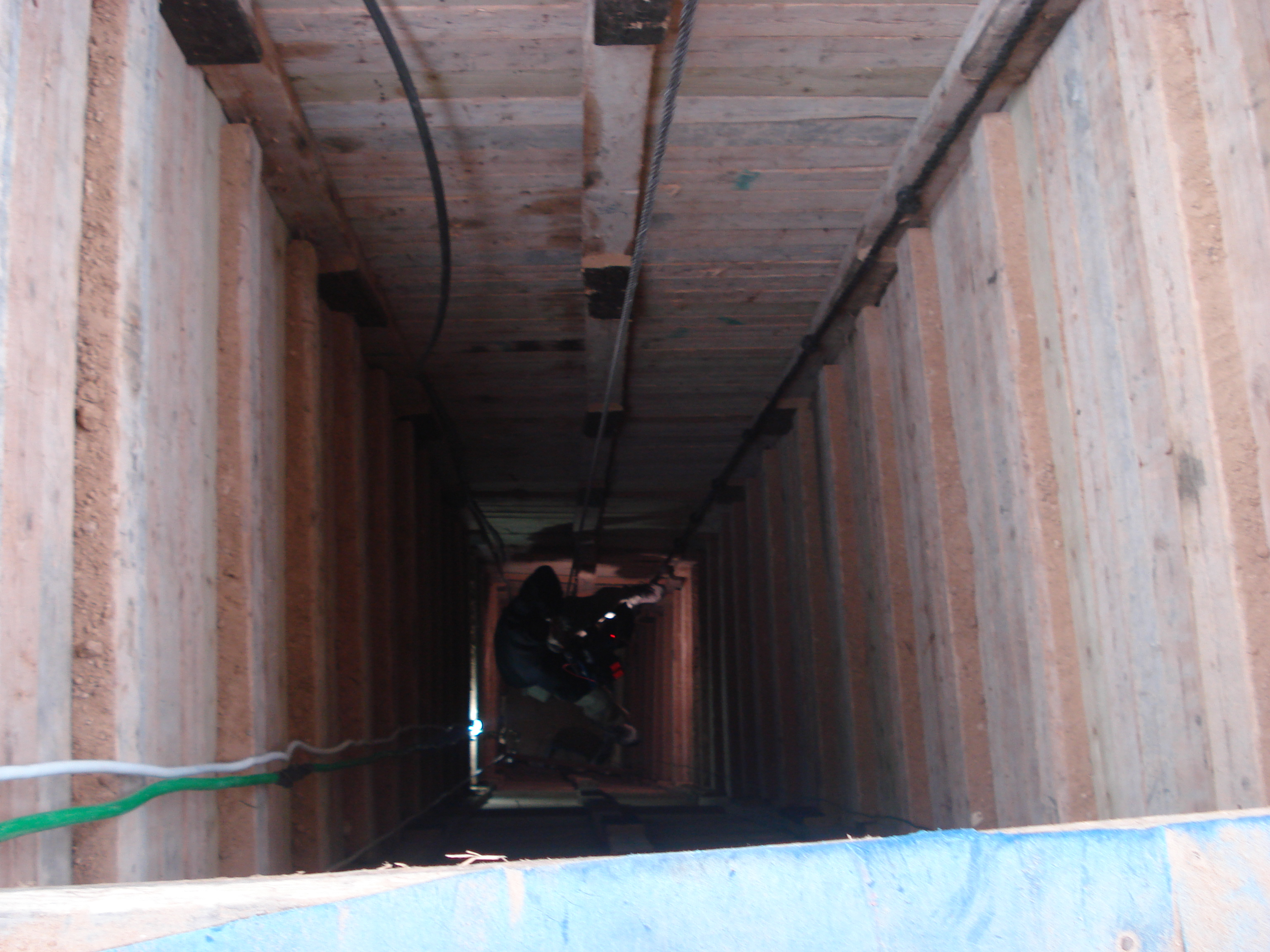
Entry of a Gaza smuggling tunnel

The tunnels are normally dug by individual contractors from basements of houses or an olive grove under the border at depths of up to 30 meters (100 feet), and reaching up to 800 meters (2640 feet) in length. In many cases, the owners of the houses enter into a business arrangement with the tunnel builders. They may receive a portion of the profits from the smuggling or some other sort of financial compensation from those who contract the tunnel construction. While many tunnels are of a generally high quality of engineering and construction – with some including electricity, ventilation, intercoms, and a rail system – they are still very dangerous and are prone to cave-ins. The openings to many tunnels are found within buildings in or around Gaza's southernmost city of Rafah.

== Measures taken against smuggling tunnels ==
=== Measures taken by Israel ===
See also Gaza War (2008–2009) (IDF "Operation Cast Lead"), March 2012 Gaza–Israel clashes (IDF "Operation Returning Echo"), November 2012 Israeli operation in the Gaza Strip (IDF "Operation Pillar of Defense"), 2014 Gaza War (IDF "Operation Protective Edge"), 2021 Israel–Palestine crisis (IDF "Operation Guardian of the Walls"), Israeli invasion of the Gaza Strip (2023–present) (IDF "Operation Swords of Iron")

Israel has destroyed hundreds of homes along the Gaza–Egypt border to enlarge the buffer zone, asserting that they were used to hide smugglers' tunnels. The Israel Defense Forces (IDF) maintain that this was done in order to prevent smuggling tunnels, and that incursions into Rafah and the destruction of tunnels and/or shafts under homes was the most effective means to close the tunnels down. An IDF spokeswoman has stated that in destroying tunnels, the IDF exercises "the utmost care to pinpoint the tunnels and do as little damage as possible".

Israel, Egypt, the United States, and other North Atlantic Treaty Organization (NATO) countries have pledged to stop or slow smuggling to Gaza by land and sea.

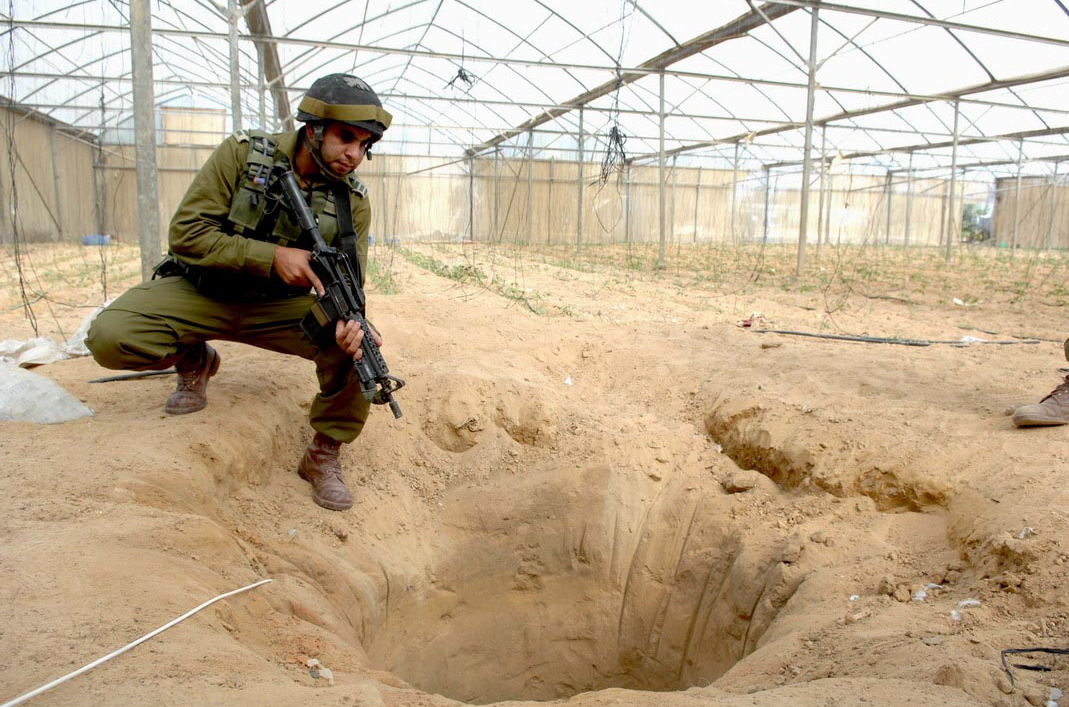
Tunnel found near Egyptian border by Israeli forces, October 2006

Although Israeli air strikes rendered over 100 tunnels inoperative during Operation Pillar of Defense, many of them were restored within a few weeks because the main damage was sustained at the openings, not in the middle sections.

During the 2014 Gaza War, Israel launched a ground offensive into Gaza with the primary objective being to fully destroy the cross border tunnels. In total 31 tunnels were destroyed during the weeks the IDF was in Gaza.

On 11 August 2014, the IDF announced they had successfully tested a system that could be used to detect these tunnels. This new system uses a combination of sensors and special transmitters to locate tunnels. The IDF expects development to cost up to NIS 1.5 billion, and could be deployed within the year.

=== Measures taken by Egypt ===
Some measures such as Egypt's construction of an underground fence along its side of the Gaza–Egypt border have been taken. In late 2009 Egypt started construction of a subterranean barrier in an attempt to curb the use of smuggling tunnels. Nevertheless, anti-smuggling capabilities remain limited and constrained.

In 2010, Egypt sprayed toxic gas into the tunnels, killing four Palestinians.

In 2011, Egypt began sealing a series of smugglers’ tunnels between its border and the Gaza Strip. The Egyptian army has increased its deployment along its border since 5 August 2012, when 16 Egyptian border police were killed in a terror attack. Since then there have been reports that the Egyptian army has been destroying smuggling tunnels by flooding them.

In 2013, following the 2013 Egyptian coup d'état that ousted the pro-Hamas government, the Egyptian army has destroyed many of the tunnels, with the effect that "prices have soared, shelves are empty, utilities have suspended operations for lack of fuel and travel is restricted once again".

In 2013, the Egyptian military started resorting to a pungent new tactic to shut down the smuggling tunnels connecting Sinai and Gaza: flooding them with sewage.

Smuggling tunnels and the various methods different countries have used to address the types of threats tunnels pose to national security has been discussed in the literature.

After President el-Sisi assumed leadership of Egypt in 2013, the Egyptian Army launched an aggressive campaign of destroying tunnels between Gaza and Egyptian territory. As of August 2014, the Egyptian Military destroyed 1,659 smuggling tunnels.

Palestinian President Mahmoud Abbas agreed with the destruction of smuggling tunnels, arguing that they had produced 1,800 millionaires, and were used for smuggling weapons, drugs, cash and equipment for forging documents. Abbas had previously recommended the sealing or destruction of the tunnels by flooding them and then punishing the owners of the homes that contained entrances to the tunnels, including demolishing their homes.

On 11 September 2015, the Egyptian army began to pump water from the Mediterranean Sea into the tunnels. A number of Palestinian factions condemned the flooding of the border with sea water, because it posed a serious threat to the environment and ground water. In February 2016, it was reported that the flooding was creating an environmental disaster and having a catastrophic effect on the basic livelihoods of millions of Palestinians.

According to Egyptian President el-Sisi, flooding of the tunnels had been carried out in coordination with the Palestinian Authority. On 6 February 2016, Israeli Minister Yuval Steinitz said that Sisi ordered the flooding of several Hamas tunnels to a certain extent due to Israel's request. He affirmed that Egyptian–Israeli security cooperation was "better than ever".

==== Buffer zone ====
In October 2014, days after an attack in which 33 Egyptian soldiers were killed, Egypt announced it may create a buffer zone between Palestinian Rafah and Egyptian Rafah, where most tunnels are believed to be. Initial width of the buffer zone was 500 meters but on 18 November 2014, Egypt said it would expand it to 1 km. On 29 December 2014 the buffer zone was extended again to 5 km.

== See also ==
- Palestinian tunnel warfare in the Gaza Strip
- Anti-tunnel barrier along the Gaza–Israel border
- Gaza imports
- Israeli–Palestinian conflict
