= Salafi jihadist insurgency in the Gaza Strip =

21st-century conflict in the Gaza Strip

- Part of Palestinian internal political violence and the Gaza–Israel conflict
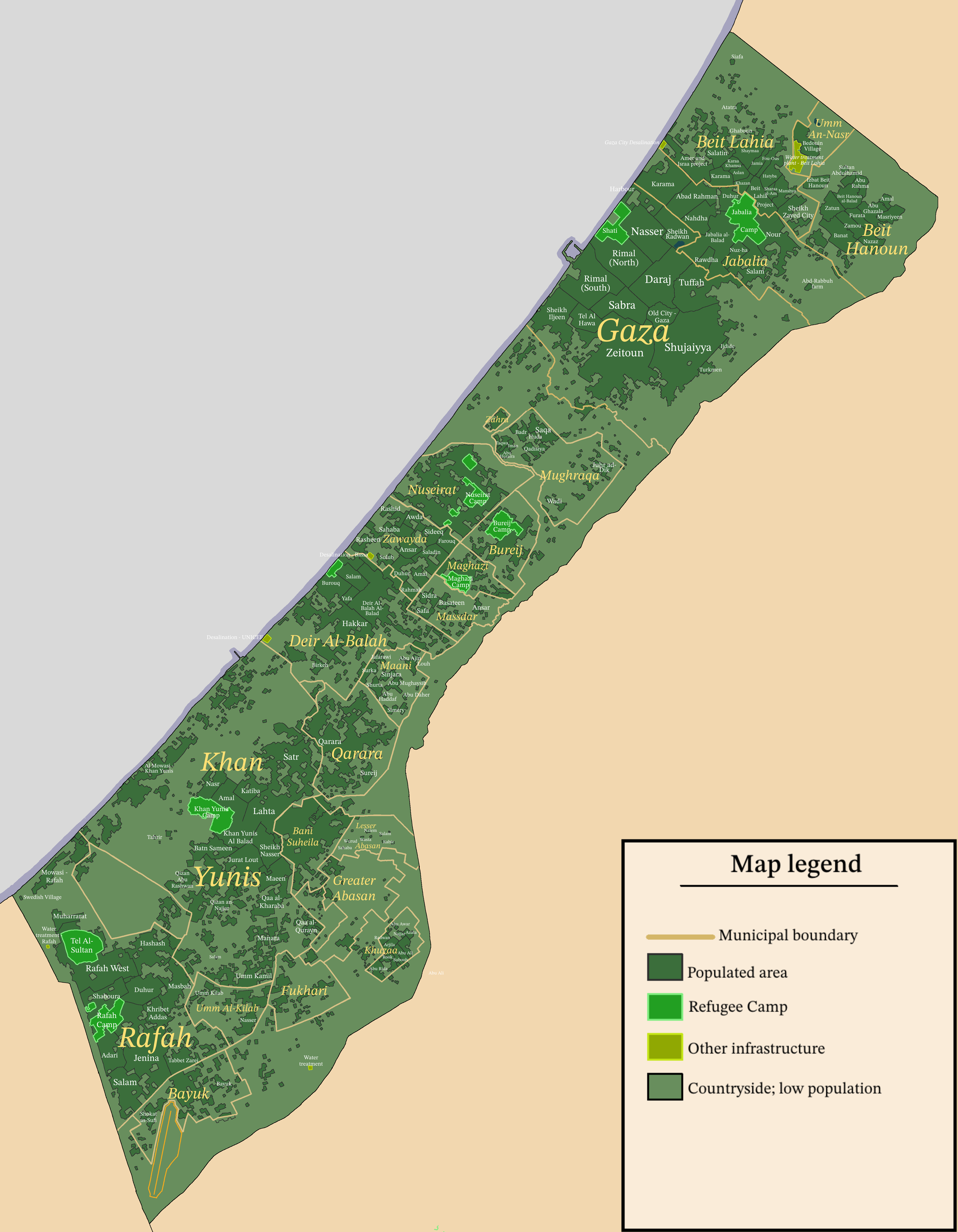
- Map of the Gaza Strip
Date	2001 – present
Location	Gaza Strip, Palestine (with spillover into Egypt, Israel, and the West Bank)
Status	Ongoing

Belligerents
(al-Qaeda) (Islamic State) Salafi jihadist groups	(Palestine) Hamas government and allies Israel Palestinian Authority (Until 2007)

Commanders and leaders
Mumtaz Dughmush; Abdel Latif Moussa †; Khalid Banat †; Mahmoud Taleb (Islamic State) Hisham Al-Saedni X (Islamic State) Yunis Hunnar †	(Palestine) Ismail Haniyeh X (Hamas) Yahya Sinwar † (Palestine) Saber Siam X (Palestine) Tawfeeq Abu Naeem

Units involved
List: 2001–2012: Jaysh al-Islam (Note: Jaysh al-Islam switched allegiance from Al-Qaeda to IS in 2015.); Dogmush clan elements; Palestinian Taliban Group; Jund Ansar Allah; Islamic Emirate of Rafah (2009); (Islamic State) MSC (Note: MSC switched its affiliation from Al-Qaeda to IS in 2014, however they have since been defunct.); Tawhid wal-Jihad; Ansar al-Sunnah; Other subgroups; Jaysh al-Ummah; Jaljalat; Palestinian Taliban Group; Suyuf al-Haq; Jihadia Salafiya; Jaish al-Mu'minun; Jund Allah; Masada al-Mujahideen; Lions of Monotheism; (Hamas) Rogue elements within the Al-Qassam Brigades; Anonymous cells 2014–2021: (Islamic State) Jama'at Ansar al-Dawla al-Islamiyya fi Bayt al-Maqdis; (Islamic State) Sheikh Omar Hadid Brigade; (Islamic State) Aknaf Beit al-Makdis; (Islamic State) Jaysh al-Islam (Note: Against Israel only); (Islamic State) Katibat al-Sheikh al-Emireen (Note: Against Israel only.); Anonymous cells 2023–present: Jaysh al-Ummah; Islamic State; Palestine District (disputed); (Islamic State) Jaysh al-Islam; (Palestine) Popular Forces elements (disputed); (Palestine) Popular Army – Northern Forces elements	List: Hamas government; Palestinian Joint Operations Room; Hamas; (Hamas) Al-Qassam Brigades; Palestinian Islamic Jihad; (Palestinian Islamic Jihad) Al-Quds Brigades; Popular Resistance Committees; (Popular Resistance Committees) Al-Nasser Salah al-Deen Brigades; Doghmush clan elements; Ministry of the Interior (Gaza); Internal Security Services; Rad'a Force; Gaza Police; Arrow Unit; Israel Defense Forces; Israeli Ground Forces; Israeli Air Force; Shin Bet; (no border) Palestinian Security Services; (no border) Palestinian General Intelligence Service

Strength
4,000–5,000 militants (2009 estimate)	(Palestine) (Hamas) 15,000–40,000+ militants

Casualties and losses
At least 87 militants killed by Hamas; At least 10 militants killed by Israel	7 Al-Qassam Brigades militants killed 9 Hamas police officers killed 1 Israeli soldier killed 1 PA brigadier general killed
- 22 Palestinian civilians killed 1 Italian citizen killed 1 Israeli civilian killed 1 foreign worker in Israel killed

The Salafi jihadist insurgency in the Gaza Strip is a low-level conflict that has primarily involved Hamas and various Gazan Salafi jihadist militant groups that seek to challenge its governance of the territory.

Gazan Salafi jihadists first became active in the early 2000s. The insurgency first escalated during the late 2000s and early 2010s with events such as the 2009 Battle of Rafah and the 2011 kidnapping and murder of Vittorio Arrigoni. A truce between the two sides was signed in 2013. However, the emergence of the Islamic State (IS) in the mid-2010s emboldened Gazan Salafi jihadists, leading to a resumption of direct clashes between Hamas and IS-affiliated forces in 2015.

Salafi jihadist groups operating in the Gaza Strip have typically engaged in armed clashes with Hamas forces and attacked various civilian targets, as well as launched attacks against Israel. The conflict is rooted in ideological differences, with Salafi jihadist groups opposing Hamas' Palestinian nationalism in favor of a transnational jihadism and full implementation of Sharia law. Many of these groups have aligned themselves with Al-Qaeda and/or IS, both which fall as well into the Salafi jihadist category. Only one Salafi jihadist group, Jaysh al-Ummah, has historically refrained from participating in the fighting against Hamas.

== Background ==
Salafism was first introduced into the Gaza Strip in the 1970s by Palestinian students who had returned from studying abroad at religious schools in Saudi Arabia. The early movement was seen as helping Saudi efforts to propagate Wahhabism (which is often seen as a subset of Salafism) and counter the Iranian Shia Islam of Ruhollah Khomeini. According to journalist Jared Maslin, a number of Salafi groups in the Gaza Strip continue to receive support and funding from the Saudi government today.

The first documented Salafi organization in the Gaza Strip was "Dar al-Kitab wa-al-Sunna" (House of the Book and Sunnah), established in 1975 by Sheikah Yasin al-Astal, which was non-violent and focused on preaching and education. During this time, Gazan Salafis distanced themselves from Palestinian politics and the struggle against Israel. Many Palestinians distrusted them, and as a result they were sometimes marginalized and isolated.

The integration of jihadist ideology into Gazan Salafism began in the 2000s, and appears to have correlated with similar radicalization processes in the Sinai; the first reports on "violent Salafis" date to this period as well.

== Beginnings and spread (2001–2005) ==
=== 2001 ===
According to a Gazan Salafi jihadist militant interviewed in 2010, the first ever attack in the Gaza Strip carried out by Salafi jihadists was in 2001, by a group called Jund Allah (not to be confused with Jund Ansar Allah, founded in 2008). The nature or target of the attack is unknown.

=== 2002 ===
In December, Israeli prime minister Ariel Sharon said that Israel believed Al-Qaeda had established a presence in the Gaza Strip. The autonomous Palestinian Authority (PA), which governed Gaza at the time, vigorously denied the allegation.

=== 2003 ===
In October, an American diplomatic convoy was bombed in Gaza; Salafi jihadists were alleged to be the perpetrators.

=== 2005 ===
A number of Salafi jihadist militant groups were established in the Gaza Strip, during the months preceding the Israeli disengagement from the territory in August and September.

In October, Mumtaz Dogmush of the Dogmush clan, a Gazan criminal family, founded Jaysh al-Islam ("The Army of Islam").

== Escalation (2006–2012) ==
=== 2006 ===
The Hamas victory in the 2006 Palestinian legislative election, held in January, was a turning point for the attitudes of many Salafi jihadists towards the group. The PA democratic election was seen as incompatible with a Sharia political system, and the Salafi jihadists began to oppose Hamas for its participation. Suyuf al-Haq and Jaljalat were founded in response to Hamas' participation in the election. That year, Suyuf al-Haq began a campaign of attacks against local internet cafés, music shops, media facilities, and civilians, and also threatened to blow up local Christian churches in response to the publication in Denmark of cartoons depicting the prophet Muhammed.

There was generally a period of "post-election turmoil", with Jund Allah, Suyuf al-Haq, and a number of then active Salafi jihadist groups conducting attacks in Gaza.

Jaysh al-Islam, however, was still on good terms with Hamas. The group participated in a Gaza cross-border raid on 25 June alongside Hamas and its ally the Popular Resistance Committees, capturing Israel Defense Forces (IDF) soldier Gilad Shalit. Hamas appears to have collaborated with Jaysh al-Islam in order to present the operation as a "national undertaking".

On 14 August, Jaysh al-Islam kidnapped two Fox News journalists, who were later freed on 27 August. In reaction to the kidnapping, Hamas stated they had "received assurances that similar acts would not recur".

On 16 September, a group calling itself the Lions of Monotheism firebombed five Christian churches in response to the controversy over Pope Benedict XVI's comments on Islam. While one of the church attacks occurred in the Gaza Strip, the other four were carried out in Nablus, in the West Bank. Hamas leader Ismail Haniyeh, who had become prime minister of the Palestinian Authority due to the earlier election victory, condemned the attacks. Also in September, according to Hamas, Jaysh al-Islam murdered Jad Tayeh, a former PA Brigadier General who was a General Intelligence Service official.

In late November, Suyuf al-Haq launched a series of attacks against internet cafés and record shops.

=== 2007 ===
In March, Jaysh al-Islam kidnapped BBC journalist Alan Johnston, and stated they would release him in exchange for the release of an Al-Qaeda cleric imprisoned in the United Kingdom. According to a Hamas cleric, this action led Hamas to definitively cut off relations with Jaysh al-Islam.

In May, an especially anti-Christian group called Jihadia Salafiya was suspected of attacking a UNRWA school after it hosted a coed sporting event. The attack left one person dead.

Following the Battle of Gaza in June, which saw Hamas take over the Gaza Strip, the Salafi jihadists' freedom of maneuver was reduced. The new Hamas administration then turned against Jaysh al-Islam and issued an ultimatum for the release of Johnston. When this was ignored, Hamas arrested a Jaysh al-Islam leader, Khattab al-Maqdisi, who reportedly organized the kidnapping and was close to Mumtaz Dogmush. Jaysh al-Islam retaliated by kidnapping several students from the Islamic University of Gaza. Hamas' Executive Force then arrested 15 members of the Dogmush clan and besieged Mumtaz Dogmush's home in Gaza City, after which Johnston's release was secured.

On 6 October, Rami Ayyad, a Gazan Christian who owned the only Christian bookstore in the Gaza Strip, was kidnapped and murdered by Salafi jihadists as part of a broader campaign to drive out Christians from Gaza. The group Jaish al Mu’minun, also known as "Al-Qaeda in Palestine", claimed responsibility for the murder.

=== 2008 ===
In February, Jaysh al-Islam attacked a YMCA building in Gaza and temporarily abducted its security guards.

In April, Masada al-Mujahideen announced its formation. The group would go on to claim various arson attacks– of dubious validity– in Israel and even the United States.

On 25 July, three bombings in Gaza occurred– one at an empty café, one at the home of a Hamas cleric and legislator, and one at a gathering of Al-Qassam Brigades commanders, which caused casualties. According to Hamas, the attack targeting the Al-Qassam Brigades gathering was orchestrated by Fatah, but the other two were orchestrated by Jaysh al-Islam. Hamas police then entered the Sabra neighborhood of Gaza City– controlled by the Dogmush clan– and engaged in an hours-long clash with Jaysh al-Islam militants and Dogmush clan gunmen.

On 1 September, Jaysh al-Ummah organized its first "public training session" in southern Gaza, using the opportunity to criticize the Hamas government. Two days later, Hamas arrested the group's leader Abu Hafs al-Maqdisi, prompting the group to threaten violent responses unless their commander was released. Sometime in September, Hamas forces reentered Sabra and forcibly ended the Dogmush control over the neighborhood.

In October, Jaysh al-Islam militants clashed with Popular Resistance Committees militants led by another Dogmush clan member, Zakaria Dogmush.

Sometime in late 2008, Jund Ansar Allah was founded.

=== 2009 ===
This year saw the establishment of the Palestinian Taliban Group, with around 100 members, by the emir of the organization, Abu Osama, with the intent to combat Hamas.

On 27 January, a newly formed group called Jahafil Al-Tawhid Wal-Jihad fi Filastin or simply Tawhid wal-Jihad conducted a bomb attack beneath an Israeli military jeep, killing one soldier.

On 8 June, Jund Ansar Allah militants launched a dramatic but unsuccessful attack on horseback against the Karni crossing of the Gaza-Israel border, and were all shot dead by IDF troops. Hamas responded to the attack with a "stern warning" to the group to abide by the ceasefire then in place with Israel, but Jund Ansar Allah allegedly then proceeded to orchestrate a wave of attacks against local businesses.

On 21 July, in Khan Yunis, an explosion at the wedding of the nephew of Muhammad Dahlan resulted in dozens of injuries. It is disputed whether Jund Ansar Allah was responsible, but in any case Hamas police ended up pursuing Jund Ansar Allah militants and besieging a group of them inside a building. The standoff ended after a day, following negotiations mediated by local clerics.

On 11 August, Jund Ansar Allah circulated instructions for Gazan Salafi jihadists to attend Friday prayers at the Ibn Taymiyya Mosque in Rafah, where Abdel Latif Moussa was set to give a sermon titled "Golden Advice to Ismail Haniyeh". On 14 August, with the mosque filled with weapons and armed militants, Moussa gave his sermon, during which he declared the formation of the "Islamic Emirate of Rafah" and implementation of Sharia. After an Al-Qassam Brigades commander was killed by a Jund Ansar Allah sniper outside the mosque, a one-day battle erupted between the two sides in the area. It resulted in a Hamas victory and the near-eradication of the group. Later that month, Jaljalat carried out two bombing attacks against Hamas government buildings in retaliation for the events in Rafah.

In September, Jaljalat revealed that it had attempted to assassinated former American president Jimmy Carter and former British prime minister Tony Blair, but the plot had been foiled by Hamas. During that month, Jaljalat carried out a wave of attacks on Hamas forces.

In early October, Hamas captured Mahmoud Taleb, the leader of Jaljalat. Also that month, remmants of Jund Ansar Allah carried out a rocket attack against Israel.

In December, Taleb escaped custody.

=== 2010 ===
Sometime in early 2010, Salafi jihadists conducted three bombings targeting the cars of Hamas officials.

In February, Jaysh al-Islam militants allegedly bombed a convoy of Red Cross vehicles. Mumtaz Dogmush, however, denied he had ordered the attack, and the militants said to be responsible were arrested.

In March, remnants of Jund Ansar Allah carried out a rocket attack against Israel. That month, Hamas recaptured Taleb, and his return to prison weakened Jaljalat's operational capabilities. Also that month, the group Ansar al-Sunnah carried out a rocket attack that killed one Thai worker in Israel.

Two attacks in 2010 appear to have been carried out by Salafi jihadist elements within Hamas. On 23 May, a UNRWA summer camp was vandalized and burned down. The suspects, who were arrested by Hamas, were actually Al-Qassam Brigades militants who may have had a Salafi jihadist orientation. Then on 19 September, gunmen alleged to be Salafi jihadists burned down Gaza's Crazy Water Park; the perpetrators are widely believed to have also been members of the Al-Qassam Brigades.

An Israeli helicopter strike killed Jaysh al-Islam senior leader Mohammed Jamil al-Nemnem, 27, in Gaza City on 3 November 2010. Nemnem was second-in-command to Mumtaz Doghmush. Egypt had reportedly tipped-off Israel that Nemnem was helping plan an attack on the Multinational Force and Observers in the Sinai Peninsula. In a subsequent statement, Israel claimed Nemnem was involved in directing multiple terrorist attacks targeting Israelis in recent years.

Following the Nemnem strike, the Israeli Air Force killed group members Mohammed and Islam Yassif in a drone strike on 17 November 2010. The strike was coordinated with Israeli Shin Bet and occurred around dawn on a busy street in Gaza City, and cited the same security issues as that in the killing of Namnam.

On 21 December, Jaysh al-Islam retaliated for the Israeli strikes, launching a rocket at Zikim that almost hit a kindergarten.

=== 2011 ===
Egyptian authorities stated that the January 2011 Alexandria bombing, on New Year's Day, was carried out by Jaysh al-Islam. Mumtaz Dogmush denied his group was responsible but praised the attack anyways. The attack, which targeted Coptic Christians, was the deadliest act of violence against the community in a decade, since the Kosheh massacre in 2000 which left 20 Copts dead. The day after the Alexandria attack, on 2 January, Jaljalat targeted the home of a Hamas Internal Security Service official with a car bomb.

In February, a Gazan Christian surgeon was attacked by Salafi jihadists, according to Hamas.

In March, Hamas arrested the Tawhid wal-Jihad leader, Hisham Sa’idni (also known by the alias Abu al-Walid al-Maqdisi).

On 14 April, Tawhid wal-Jihad carried out the kidnapping of Vittorio Arrigoni, a pro-Palestinian activist from Italy who was living in Gaza. Tawhid wal-Jihad stated that if Sa’idni was not released by Hamas, they would execute Arrigoni. However, Arrigoni was found dead well before the deadline; Hamas stormed the house where he was being held and successfully fought the abductors, but found him hanged. On 19 April, Hamas police clashed with Tawhid wal-Jihad militants during a house raid targeting suspects in Arrigoni's murder. Ultimately, two of the militants were killed and one was captured. Hamas then arrested a number of Salafi jihadists across Gaza.

A France 24 interviewer, Salama Atallah, was arrested and beaten by Hamas security forces and subject to humiliation. The main reasons he was arrested was because Atallah refused to give the names of Palestinian Taliban Group members while Hamas security forces attempted to torture the information out of him.

=== 2012 ===
By 2012, Sa'idni had created an umbrella group, the Mujahideen Shura Council in the Environs of Jerusalem (MSC) that incorporated Tawhid wal-Jihad, Ansar al-Sunnah, and several other Salafi jihadist groups. On 18 June, MSC launched a cross-border attack that killed one Israeli civilian.

During the 2012 Gaza War (November), several Salafi jihadist groups participated in fighting against Israel, including Jaysh al-Ummah, MSC, the Palestinian Taliban Group, and Jaysh al-Islam.

On 26 August, MSC launched three rockets at Sderot, Israel.

On 13 October, Sa'idni was killed in an Israeli airstrike, following an MSC rocket attack on Israel the day before.

== Truce period and continued tensions (2013–2014) ==
=== 2013 ===
In May, Yusuf al-Qaradawi visited the Gaza Strip to help mediate a reconciliation process between Hamas and the Salafi jihadists.

On 4 September, MSC-linked media released a video showing a recent march in Rafah by Salafi jihadist protestors who were chanting against Shiites and Jews.

In November it was reported that Hamas and the Salafi jihadists had come to a final agreement. Per the agreement, Salafi jihadists would be allowed to engage in political, military, and social advocacy activities; Hamas would cease its persecutions; a joint Hamas-Salafist committee was to be formed; and the Salafi jihadists agreed to abide by the post–2012 Gaza War ceasefire with Israel. Both sides deliberately refrained from addressing the issue of full Sharia implementation. Hamas regarded the agreement as a success that showed it could ensure internal calm and maintain control over Gaza.

=== 2014 ===
On 2 February, MSC declared allegiance to IS.

The Meir Amit Intelligence and Terrorism Information Center stated they documented several incidents of Gazan Salafi jihadist activity throughout 2014. On 12 February "Salafi jihadist elements" in Gaza declared allegiance to IS. Then on 12 June, in response to the successful IS northern Iraq offensive in June 2014, Salafi jihadists held a pro-IS rally in Rafah that was dispersed by Hamas police. On 8 July– the first day of the 2014 Gaza War– Salafi jihadists published footage of themselves launching rockets at Israel. During that war, Jaysh al-Ummah participated in fighting against Israel.

The first IS-inspired attack inside Gaza by Salafi jihadists was the October bombing of the French cultural center in Gaza City.

On 3 December, IS affiliates in Gaza, using the name "Wilayah Gaza", published a statement threatening to kill 18 Gazan poets and writers for allegedly insulting Islam. The French cultural center was bombed again on 11 December, and remmants of Jund Ansar Allah claimed responsibility.

== Fighting resumes with Hamas (2015–2021) ==
=== 2015 ===
By 2015, the IS caliph Abu Bakr Al-Baghdadi had not accepted the allegiance of any Salafi jihadists in Gaza because of the divisions that existed within the movement, according to Abu al-Walid, a "leading IS sympathizer in Gaza". This has been cited as the main reason for the migration of many Gazan Salafi jihadist youth over to Wilayah Sinai in Egypt, as in the Sinai they could have a better opportunity of establishing their own territory.

Salafi jihadist protestors held a pro-IS rally outside the French cultural center in Gaza City in January, 12 days after the Charlie Hebdo attack in Paris. Hamas responded with a renewed arrest campaign of Salafi jihadists.

On 6 April, Hamas security services arrested Sheikh Adnan Mayt, a prominent Salafi jihadist activist, followed by the arrests of other Salafi jihadists. Because of this, armed conflict between the Salafi jihadists and Hamas resumed. On 17 April, an explosion occurred at a roundabout in western Gaza City, and on 18 April, two more bomb attacks targeted the UNRWA headquarters and the UNRWA general prosector's office. Abu al-Ayna al-Ansari, a Salafi jihadist official, said that his movement did not conduct these bombings and insinuated they were part of an inside job by Hamas.

On 1 May, Hamas forces attacked Salafi jihadists that were leaving Friday prayers at the Al-Moutahabbin Mosque in eastern Deir el-Balah; on 3 May, Hamas demolished the mosque. The next day Salafi jihadists carried out bombing attacks on a security office and a school in Gaza City. Also in May, a new group calling itself Jama'at Ansar al-Dawla al-Islamiyya fi Bayt al-Maqdis ("Supporters of the Islamic State in Jerusalem") assassinated Saber Siam, a Hamas commander, in a car bombing, and fired mortar shells at an Al-Qassam Brigades headquarters in Khan Yunis. The New York Times, reporting on the attacks in May, described IS as having "energized" Gazan Salafi jihadists.

On 2 June, Hamas raided the home of Yunis Hunnar, leader of a new IS-affiliated group in Gaza, the Sheikh Omar Hadid Brigade. Hunnar was shot dead while resisting arrest. On 30 June, IS media in Aleppo, Syria posted a video denouncing Hamas and threatening to overthrow it. In the weeks that followed, Hamas arrested hundreds of Gazan Salafi jihadists.

In July, Salafi jihadists bombed vehicles belonging to Hamas and its ally Palestinian Islamic Jihad, which was followed by more arrests.

The Sheikh Omar Hadid Brigade launched four attacks against Israel in September. On 9 September, Jaysh al-Islam declared allegiance to IS.

=== 2016 ===
On 1 July, the IS affiliated group Aknaf Beit al-Makdis launched a rocket into Israel which severely damaged an empty preschool in Sderot.

On 21 August, Aknaf Beit al-Makdis launched another rocket that struck Sderot.

In December, Hamas forces clashed with Gazan Salafi jihadists during a raid by the former.

=== 2017 ===
Rocket attacks on Israel on 6 February and 27 February were reported to be the work of Salafi jihadists who wanted to provoke Israel into retaliations against Hamas.

Gazan Salafi jihadists were involved in an IS attack on an Egyptian security checkpoint near the Gaza-Egypt border, on 7 July.

On 17 August, a Hamas border guard was killed in an Salafi jihadist suicide attack for the first time at the Gaza-Egypt border. The attacker, allegedly affiliated with IS, had been trying to enter Egypt but ended up clashing with Hamas guards that tried to detain him.

In October, Salafi jihadists allegedly targeted Hamas security chief Tawfeeq Abu Naeem in a car bombing; he survived the attack.

=== 2018 ===
On 3 January, Wilayah Sinai published a propaganda video depicting the execution of a man who they stated had smuggled weapons to Hamas from Egypt. The executioners were led by a Gazan Salafi jihadist militant, Hamza al-Zamli, who in the video urged IS supporters to attack Hamas targets, Palestinian Christians, and Palestinian Shiites. Another Gazan, the former Al-Qassam Brigades member Muhammad al-Dajani, carried out the execution in the video. The language used in the video also indicated that IS considered Hamas an enemy equivalent to Fatah and Israel.

In August 2018, Jaysh al-Islam carried out mortar attacks against Israel in retaliation for the killing of a Gaza resident in an IDF airstrike.

=== 2019 ===
On 10 August, four militants, who according to Palestinian sources were Salafi jihadists and former Hamas members, attempted to infiltrate into Israel but were shot and killed by the IDF. On 27 August, IS-linked Salafi jihadists carried out two suicide bombings that killed three Gaza police officers.

On 3 October, the pro-Hezbollah Lebanese newspaper Al Akbar reported that in recent months Hamas had arrested four Gazan Salafi jihadist cells planning attacks on Hamas forces and top officials.

=== 2021 ===
On 11 May, during the 2021 Israel–Palestine crisis, an IS-affiliated group in Gaza called Katibat al-Sheikh al-Emireen launched rockets into southern Israel alongside Jaysh al-Ummah.

On 5 August, Salafi jihadists bombed a coastal resort in Beit Lahiya after it allegedly hosted a mixed-gender music concert.

== Continuation during the Gaza war (2023–present) ==
=== 2023 ===
Salafi jihadist forces initially appeared to be absent following the start of the Gaza war in October 2023. An exception was Jaysh al-Ummah, which has fought against Israeli forces invading the Gaza Strip and likely supports a loose collaboration with Hamas and its allies. On 19 October, IS released a statement in Al-Naba where it condemned Hamas for fighting "under the banner of the Iranian axis" and called for militants in the Gaza Strip to first embrace IS ideology before fighting Israel. Later on 21 December, Aymenn Jawad Al-Tamimi, writing for Middle East Forum, predicted that even if Israel managed to dismantle Hamas' control over Gaza in its invasion, Gazan Salafi jihadist groups would continue to "remain marginal".

=== 2024 ===
The Israeli-backed Popular Forces, led by Yasser Abu Shabab, emerged in May 2024 following the start of the Rafah offensive. Following the Kerem Shalom aid convoy looting of November 2024, Israeli newspaper Haaretz reported that some of the perpetrators, later revealed to be the Popular Forces, were linked to IS.

=== 2025 ===
In June 2025, Israel revealed it had been supporting the Popular Forces, and in response both Hamas and elements of the Israeli opposition claimed the group was linked to IS. This allegation has been heavily contested.

Israeli opposition legislator Avigdor Lieberman alleged the Popular Forces were "a group of criminals and offenders who identify with ISIS", and an unnamed Israeli security official told Yedioth Ahronoth that the group has "close ties" to IS affiliates in Egypt. Israeli opposition leader Yair Lapid also referred to the Popular Forces as "affiliated" with IS. On the other side, Hamas Political Bureau member and spokesman Basem Naim told Newsweek that the Popular Forces is a group of "agents, drug dealers, thieves, and extremists linked to ISIS".

On 12 June, Middle East Eye reported that "key figures" in the Popular Forces have links to IS; one commander, Ghassan Duhine, was formerly an official in Jaysh al-Islam (which had declared allegiance to IS in 2015), and another commander, Issam Nabahin, was a member of Wilayah Sinai in the mid-2010s. Nabahin had been captured by Hamas forces on 9 June, but escaped and returned to Popular Forces-controlled territory in eastern Rafah. +972 Magazine also reported that Abu Anas Zeidan, a prominent lieutenant of the Popular Army – Northern Forces, is a former IS member.

Aymenn Jawad Al-Tamimi, writing for Middle East Forum, disputed the allegations that the Popular Forces is linked to IS. He argues that the group's use of the Palestinian flag in their logo and uniforms would be unacceptable to the anti-nationalist IS, even as a disguise, and that collaboration with Israel would constitute apostasy from Islam from an IS perspective. While al-Tamini concedes that some members of the group may have a Salafi background, he states this is far removed from the notion of an IS-Israeli collaboration against Hamas. Abu Shabab himself has denied ties to IS.

On 29 August, the IDF stated that an airstrike conducted several days earlier had targeted and killed Muhammad Abd al-Aziz Abu Zubaida in Bureij. According to the IDF report, Abu Zubaida was the head of the "Palestine District", a purported IS network covering Gaza, the West Bank, and the Sinai. The report also said his operatives had been involved in fighting Israeli troops during the Gaza war. Major General Mohamed Abdel Wahid, former deputy head of Egypt's General Intelligence Service, alleged in response that there is no IS presence in the Gaza Strip besides lone wolves, and that the Israeli claims are propaganda aiming to link Hamas to IS.

=== 2026 ===
On 2 August, the IDF confirms that they have killed Alaa Imad Khamis Tarams, a Jaysh al-Islam militant in Gaza City.

== See also ==
- "Hamas is ISIS"
- Palestinian political violence
- Islam and nationalism
- Islamism in the Gaza Strip
- Sinai insurgency
- Gaza–Israel conflict
- Al-Qaeda–Islamic State conflict
- International propagation of the Salafi movement and Wahhabism
- Societal breakdown in the Gaza Strip during the Gaza war
