= Masada al-Mujahideen =

Palestinian terrorist organization

- مأسدة المجاهدين
- Political leader: Abu al-Walid al-Maqdisi
- Dates active: 2008–2013
- Allegiance: Al-Qaeda
- Ideology: Salafist jihadism Wahhabism
- Status: defunct
- Wars: Gaza–Israel conflict Salafi-jihadist insurgency in the Gaza Strip

Masada al-Mujahideen (Arabic: مأسدة المجاهدين) was a Palestinian terrorist organization associated with Al-Qaeda operating within the Gaza Strip.

== History ==
The group first came into prominence after releasing a video online showing them dropping a bomb on the Israeli city of Sderot. This prompted the Israeli Air Force to carry out airstrikes against Masada al-Mujahideen in the Gaza Strip. Following clashes with the Israeli Defense Forces, another jihadist organization in the Gaza Strip, Jaysh al-Ummah (also known as the Army of the Ummah), began fighting Masada al-Mujahideen due to disapproval of their activities. Later that year, Masada al-Mujahideen established a media wing for propaganda called Riah, which initially operated on Google+ until its account was taken down. The group then moved its operations to Facebook, where it created eulogies for Osama bin Laden, Attiya Allah, and Abu Yahya al-Libi.

=== Attacks in Israel ===
Masada al-Mujahideen, a couple of months after the bomb attack, threatened further "operations" in Israel. Later that day, they claimed responsibility for a train fire in Haifa. A few days later, they also claimed responsibility for a cargo ship fire in Eilat. In July 2011, they claimed responsibility for a forest fire in Jerusalem and the Alfei Menashe fire. In October 2011, they took responsibility for multiple arson attacks in Israel. In November 2011, they claimed responsibility for an arson attack on a chemical factory owned by the Israeli government, and in December, they claimed responsibility for an arson attack on an industrial center. In 2012, they claimed responsibility for an arson attack in Be'er Ya'akov and set a military base in Ashkelon, owned by the Israel Defense Forces, on fire. Later that month, they claimed responsibility for an arson attack on an airplane factory in Haifa and a residential fire in the same city. In May 2012, in Northern Israel, they claimed responsibility for a series of fires and arson attacks, including some in the Golan Heights. The following day, they also claimed responsibility for fire attacks targeting IDF guards.

=== Attacks in Palestine and at Hamas ===
A month after the cargo ship fire, Masada al-Mujahideen attacked Palestinian Liberation Organization's soldiers following Palestine's initiation of land negotiations with Israel. The group also began carrying out light attacks on Hamas in response to their treatment of prisoners of war and regular detainees. In 2012, Masada al-Mujahideen accused Hamas of being responsible for the death of Salafi Jihadist leader Abu al-Walid al-Maqdisi and subsequently threatened and carried out attacks against Hamas.

=== Arizona wildfires and Nevada forest fires ===
In 2012, Masada al-Mujahideen attempted to claim responsibility for the Nevada forest fires, but their claim was later disproved.

In 2013, during one of Arizona's wildfires, Masada al-Mujahideen claimed responsibility with the statement, "Masada al-Mujahideen Fulfilled its Promise and Attacked America Again After the Expiration of the Period with Fires that Achieved Historic Results." They also celebrated the deaths of 19 firefighters who were attempting to put out the wildfire. However, local authorities in Arizona rejected the organization's claim.

== See also ==
- Islamist anti-Hamas groups in the Gaza Strip
