= Palestinian Taliban Group =

Gazan Salafi jihadist group

- جماعة طالبان فلسطين
- Founding leader: Abu Osama
- Dates active: 2009—Present
- Ideology: Salafi jihadism Anti-Zionism; Anti-Semitism; Anti-Christian Sentiment
- Wars: Gaza–Israel conflict; Gaza War (2008–2009); March 2010 Israel–Gaza clashes; 2012 Gaza War

Palestinian Taliban Group (Arabic: جماعة طالبان فلسطين, romanized: Jamāʻat Ṭālibān Filasṭīn) is a Salafi jihadist group in the Gaza Strip inspired by the Afghan Taliban.

== History ==
The Palestinian Taliban Group was established in 2009 with around 100 members by the emir of the organization, Abu Osama, to combat Hamas because the organization believed that Hamas deviated from the correct Islamic approach and saw the Afghan Taliban as a model militant organization. They also sought to fight Israel, the United States, and the European Union through what it thinks is the correct way according to the Quran to "uphold the banner of tawhid". The Palestinian Taliban Group manufactured its own anti-tank improvised explosive devices and named the after then-leader of the Taliban, Mullah Omar. It also expressed condolences for Osama Bin Laden after his death.

The Palestinian Taliban Group, alongside other Salafist Jihadist organizations, became a target of arrests after the kidnapping and murder of Vittorio Arrigoni by Jihadist militants. Due to this, a France 24 interviewer, Salama Atallah, was arrested and beaten by Hamas security forces and subject to humiliation. The main reasons he was arrested was because Atallah refused to give the names of the Palestinian Taliban Group members while Hamas security forces attempted to torture the information out of him.

The Palestinian Taliban Group participated in bombings against Israel Defense Forces alongside Army of Islam in 2012.
