= Army of Islam =

Army of Islam (Arabic: جيش الإسلام, Jaysh al-Islam; Azerbaijani: Qafkaz İslam Ordusu; Turkish: Kafkas İslâm Ordusu) may refer to:

- Jaysh al-Islam, a Syrian rebel group
- Army of Islam (Gaza Strip), a Palestinian organization based in the Gaza Strip
- Army of Islam (Ottoman Empire), a unit in the Ottoman army during World War I
