= Anita McNaught =

British/New Zealander journalist and television presenter

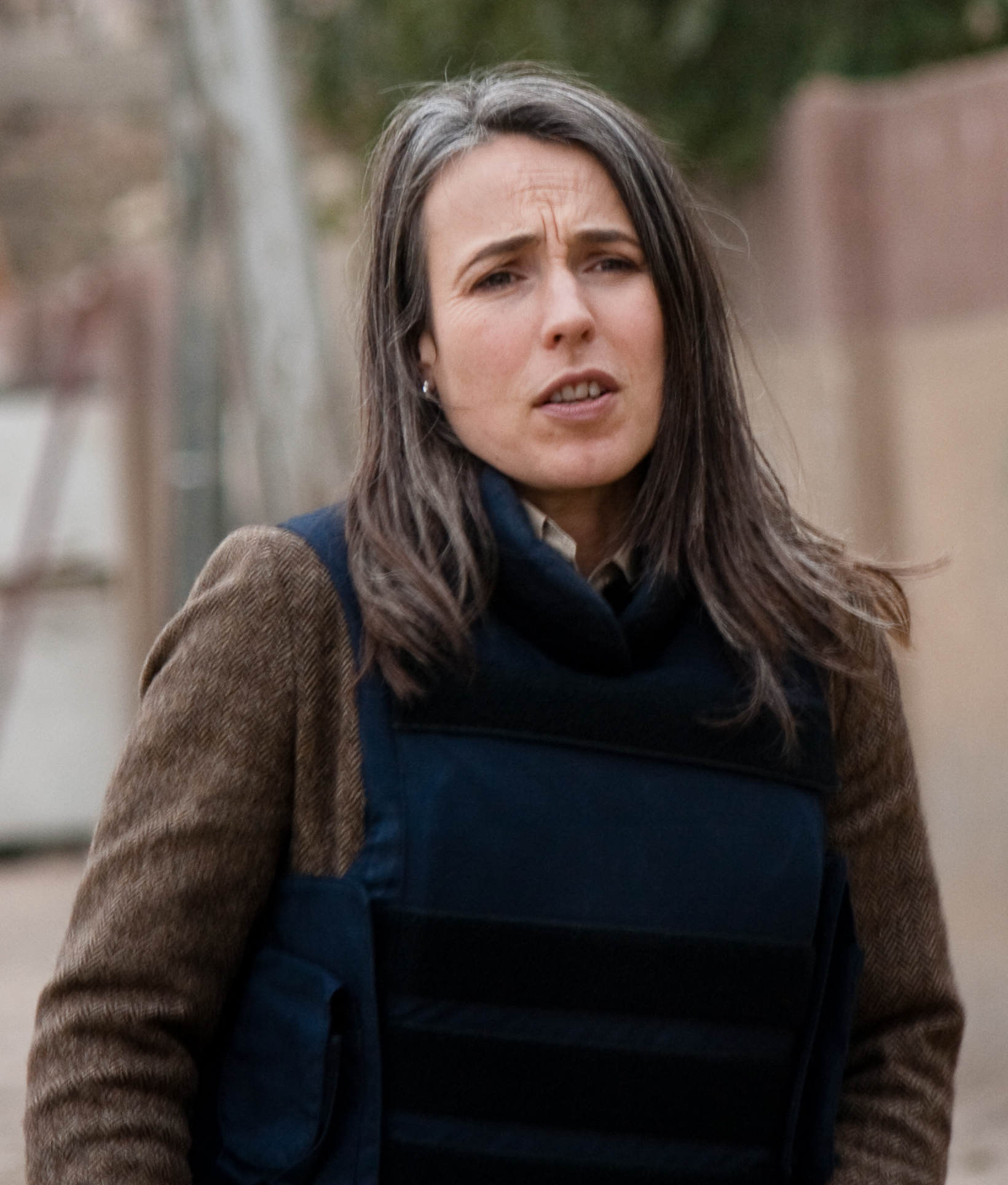
McNaught reporting from Baghdad for Al Jazeera English in 2010

Anita McNaught (born 1965) is a British journalist, television correspondent and former presenter, based in Istanbul in Turkey. Previously, she worked for Al Jazeera English for 6½ years, as a roving Middle East correspondent.

McNaught has worked as a reporter for Television New Zealand (TVNZ), BBC TV and Radio, CNN, Fox News and Al Jazeera English. She was also a regular contributor on Radio New Zealand and, in print journalism, wrote for The Times, in the UK.

== Career ==
At the age of 22 - after working for a couple of years in print - McNaught joined TVNZ as a producer and then reporter. She went on to become a popular anchor, reporter and interviewer for a number of news and current affairs programmes. In 1995, she moved to the competitor channel TV3 where she was one of the high-profile team of investigative journalists on the current affairs programme 20/20. Upon her return to the United Kingdom in 1997, she joined the BBC as a freelance journalist, presenting various programmes on BBC World News such as The World Today and Asia Today, as well as reporting for general news bulletins, until 2004. During her time in the country, she presented BBC Two's Open Minds arts and culture series in 1999, as well as Channel 4 television's miscarriage of justice series Clear My Name in 1998. Between 2000 and 2003, she also wrote features for The Times newspaper, and was a reporter on several longer foreign features for the BBC series 'Assignment' and BBC Radio 5 Live's 5 Live Report.

After leaving BBC World, she continued to work on a freelance basis for other BBC departments.

Throughout the years 1997–2006, she continued to report occasionally for both NZ's TV3 and TVNZ. She covered the death of Princess Diana for TV3, and for TVNZ the death of the Pope from Poland, the death and funeral of Yasser Arafat from Ramallah and the 2006 Israel-Lebanon war.

McNaught anchored the BBC's rolling coverage from the studio of the entry of UN forces into Kosovo and - in 2003 - US forces into Iraq.

In 2006 she made a decisive move away from the UK, working first with CNN in Bangladesh and Lebanon, then for two years (2007–2008) with Fox News in Iraq. She has worked in Gaza on two occasions, in 2006 and 2007. She joined Al Jazeera English in 2009, first as a freelance reporter, then from 2010 as a staff correspondent based out of Istanbul, Turkey. Her work for AJE has taken her to back to Iraq, Iraqi Kurdistan and Bangladesh, and to Lebanon, Pakistan, Syria, Sudan, Hungary, and as well as all over Turkey. In 2011 she spent months reporting from Libya on the uprising against Col Gaddafi, and in 2012 she filed many reports from inside Syria. In 2013 she has reported from Egypt, Japan and the Syria-Turkey border. Her last reports for AJE were from South Sudan in June and July 2014.

She contributed to the NZ satirical media show Eating Media Lunch, and was a founding board member of Women in Film and Television (WIFTNZ) in New Zealand.

== Personal life ==
Born in London, McNaught moved to New Zealand at the age of 20. She worked there for 12 years, before returning to the United Kingdom in 1997. She now has dual British and New Zealand citizenship.

Anita was married to Olaf Wiig, a cameraman for Fox News but divorced.

On 14 August 2006 Wiig was taken hostage in the Gaza Strip along with colleague Steve Centanni. Wiig and Centanni were released after 13 days in captivity, on 27 August 2006, having appeared in a videotape saying - at gunpoint - that they had "embraced Islam with the Islamic prophet Muhammad as their leader". Upon release, Olaf and Steve were reunited with family and friends. Wiig and McNaught were then taken to New York City in Rupert Murdoch's (owner of News Corp, Fox's parent company) private jet and reunited with Wiig's New Zealand family members who had flown to New York.
