= Gaza Baptist Church =

House of worship in Palestinian territories

Gaza Baptist Church الكنيسة المعمدانية
- Location: Gaza City, Gaza Strip
- Country: Palestine
- Denomination: Baptist, Evangelical

The Gaza Baptist Church (Arabic: الكنيسة المعمدانية) is a Baptist church in Gaza City, Gaza, Palestine. The church was partially destroyed during Israeli bombings in 2008, after which the church's pastor, and many of the congregation, subsequently fled the Gaza Strip.

The Gaza Baptist Church is one of only three Christian churches in the Gaza Strip, and the only one that is Protestant and evangelical – the two remaining Christian churches in the Gaza Strip are the Catholic Church of the Holy Family and the Eastern Orthodox Church of Saint Porphyrius.

The Gaza Baptist Church had a congregation of about 200 worshippers, as of 2008. Having been adversely affected by ongoing violence related to the Israeli–Palestinian conflict, and as a result of this situation and of ongoing Israeli travel restrictions, the Church's leadership, including its pastor, still lives in exile. The church, however, continues to meet, sometimes online when the regional conflict requires.

== History ==
The church was founded in 1954. It is pastored by Hanna Massad, who lives in exile in Jordan since the church was damaged by a nearby bomb blast during an airstrike on Hamas targets by Israeli forces in December 2008. Windows were blown out at the church when Israeli aircraft attacked a Hamas-controlled building across the street.

The church, which has historically ministered to approximately 150–250 of Gaza's 2,500 Christians, is one of only three Christian churches in the Gaza Strip. Among Church of Saint Porphyrius and Gaza Latin Church on Zeitoun Street, Gaza Baptist Church is the only Evangelical church in all of Gaza. The church opened Gaza's first public Christian library in 2006.

The church's building is six stories tall. The first two floors are a dedicated public library, which serves both Christian and non-Christian books. The fourth floor is used for outreach, the fifth floor is a lodge for guest workers from abroad, and the sixth floor is used as a worship hall.

Gaza's Christian minority had traditionally enjoyed good relations with the territory's larger Muslim majority. Prior to the breakdown of law and order in 2007, the Church ran youth programs, a library, and medical clinics. It also ran a school for about 250 students, many of whom were Muslim.

=== Arson attacks and collateral damage in bombing raid ===
On or before February 2007, the Church's public library was subjected to arson attacks on three separate occasions. During an Israeli air raid in December 2008, the building was damaged by a nearby bomb blast. Windows were blown out at the church when Israeli aircraft attacked a Hamas-controlled building across the street.

=== Fatah–Hamas conflict ===
Because of its height, unusual in this mostly low-rise city, the Gaza Baptist Church building was repeatedly commandeered by Fatah and Hamas troops as an observation post during the Fatah–Hamas conflict. This resulted in several of Gaza Baptist Church's staff being caught in crossfire. In one instance, a church librarian was hit by gunfire during a firefight between opposing factions. On a similar occasion, the church bus driver, a 22-year-old newlywed, was killed. The Church was raided and temporarily seized by Fatah police in February 2007.

=== Murder of church leader ===
In October 2007, one of Gaza Baptist Church's leaders, Rami Ayyad, was kidnapped, publicly beaten, and murdered by unidentified militants. Ayyad had been the manager of Gaza's only Christian bookstore, The Teacher's Bookshop. Following Ayyad's death, Gaza authorities advised Pastor Massad to relocate in order to ensure the safety of himself and his family. As a result of the violence, regular attendance at the church was adversely affected in following months.

=== Church damage in Israeli bombings, separation of families, and Israeli blockade ===
The church sustained damage during Israeli bombings in 2008. Afterwards, seven of the Church's leaders, including its pastor Hanna Massad, left Gaza. Massad moved with his family to Jordan, and five of the other six moved to the West Bank, near Bethlehem. Since then, with rare exceptions, only Massad has been allowed to return by the Israeli authorities. The five who moved to Bethlehem have been prohibited from leaving the area, as a result of which, some have not seen family members for years.

The Israeli blockade of Gaza, according to Massad in 2010, has led to "[a] lot of desperation and hopelessness among the people ... more poverty and more suffering". The cost of living has increased and medical equipment is in short supply. However, most agree that the Israeli travel restrictions are even more difficult to endure. Massad summarized the plight of Palestinian Christians as like living "between two fires. Muslim persecution and Israeli occupation."

=== Israel–Gaza war ===
During the Gaza war, the church was once again damaged during aerial bombings in 2023. The church's pastor, Hanna Massad, continued food delivery services despite the situation.

== See also ==
- Palestinian Christians
- Islamization of Gaza
- Islamist anti-Hamas groups in the Gaza Strip
