= Alan Johnston =

British journalist

- Born: 17 May 1962 (age 64); Lindi, Tanganyika
- Education: MA in English and politics, University of Dundee. Diploma in journalism studies Cardiff University.
- Occupation: Journalist
- Spouse: Fiona Mitchell
- Parent(s): Graham and Margaret Johnston

Alan Graham Johnston (born 17 May 1962) is a British journalist working for the BBC. He has been the BBC's correspondent in Uzbekistan, Afghanistan, the Gaza Strip and Italy. He is based in London.

Johnston was kidnapped in the Gaza Strip on 12 March 2007 by the militant group Army of Islam. He was unconditionally released on 4 July, nearly four months later, after much pressure was put on the group by the now-dominant Hamas.

== Early life ==
Johnston was born in Lindi, Tanganyika (present-day Tanzania), to Scottish parents.

== Education ==
Johnston was educated at the Dollar Academy, an independent school in the small town of Dollar in Clackmannanshire in central Scotland, followed by the University of Dundee, where he graduated with an MA in English and politics. He also completed a diploma in Journalism Studies from Cardiff University.

== Career ==
Johnston joined the BBC in 1991, and has spent eight years as a correspondent for them, including in Tashkent, Uzbekistan, as well as Kabul, Afghanistan. He was in Kabul when Afghanistan was still under the control of the Taliban. He was due to be the BBC's full-time correspondent in Gaza until 1 April 2007, and at the time of his kidnapping was the only foreign reporter with a major Western media organisation to still be based in the city.

Johnston covered many major stories in Gaza for the BBC, including Israel's unilateral disengagement plan in 2005, Hamas winning the 2006 legislative elections, the 2006 Israel-Gaza conflict and the Palestinian factional violence of late 2006 to 2007.

Johnston is highly regarded by the BBC as a respected, experienced journalist, and due to his local knowledge, he was someone other journalists would turn to for information when in Gaza. Prior to being kidnapped however, Johnston was not a journalist well known to the general public. Following his release he announced his intention to return to obscurity though, as of January 2008, he took over the presentation of the BBC World Service version of the programme From Our Own Correspondent.

Johnston's BBC colleague Paul Adams noted that it was Johnston's "job to bring us day after day reports of the Palestinian predicament in the Gaza Strip." Mustafa Barghouti, Palestinian Information Minister, has described Johnston as a "friend of our people", and said that Johnston "has done a lot for our cause." Imprisoned Fatah leader Marwan Barghouti has also called Johnston a "friend of the Palestinian people".

When not working as a correspondent, Johnston produced radio reports, one of which, on life after the Taliban, won a Sony Radio Academy Award bronze. Johnston has also worked as programme editor of The World Today and as a general reporter in the BBC World Service newsroom.

From November 2011 to August 2014, Johnston was the BBC correspondent in Rome. From October 2014, Johnston has stated on his Twitter account that he is now based in London.

The day after he was released, Johnston was awarded a prize by Amnesty International for his radio reports on human rights in Gaza, praising him for his "commitment to telling ordinary peoples' stories."

== Kidnapping ==
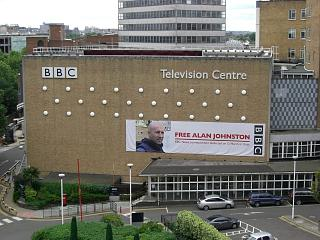
Alan Johnston banner at BBC TV Centre

On 12 March 2007, Johnston was kidnapped by the Army of Islam. His captivity led to many protests worldwide. Hamas put immense pressure on the Army of Islam, including (according to a senior Hamas militant) the threat to hunt them down and kill them if they did not release Johnston. On 4 July 2007, Johnston was freed. He was taken to meet Hamas leader Ismail Haniyeh before leaving for Jerusalem with an entourage of British diplomats.

== Honours ==
On 19 June 2008, the University of Dundee conferred an honorary degree of Doctor of Laws upon Johnston.

== Books ==
- Johnston, Alan (November 2007). Kidnapped. Profile. ISBN 978-1-84668-142-4.

== See also ==
- Durmush Hamula
- Gilad Shalit
- John McCarthy
- Yvonne Ridley
- Olaf Wiig
- Steve Centanni
- Ces Drilon
