= Taliban (disambiguation) =

The Taliban is an Afghan Islamist militant organisation.

Taliban may also refer to:

- Pakistani Taliban, known as Tehreek-e-Taliban Pakistan
- Punjabi Taliban, a defunct Taliban group which was active in the Pakistani province of Punjab
- Palestinian Taliban Group
- Jamaat Ansarullah, the Tajik Taliban
- Taliban (gang), a Kenyan criminal organization
- "Talibans" (song), a song written by Jamaican-born Kittitian recording artist Byron Messia

== See also ==
- Talibani (disambiguation)
- Pakistani Taliban (disambiguation)
