= Salafi jihadist militant groups in the Gaza Strip =

Palestinian militant groups

A number of Salafi jihadist militant groups have had a presence in the Gaza Strip, a part of the Palestinian territories. These groups began appearing in the Gaza Strip in the months leading up to and following the Israeli disengagement from the region in 2005 and have maintained a presence even after the 2007 Battle of Gaza, when Hamas wrestled control of the Gaza Strip from its rival Fatah, establishing its own de facto government in the area. Most have been engaged in an ongoing insurgency in Gaza.

Gazan Salafi jihadists have positioned themselves as rivals to Hamas, rejecting the group's Palestinian nationalism in favor of a transnational jihadism and full implementation of Sharia law; they were especially angered by Hamas' participation in the 2006 Palestinian legislative election, which they deemed incompatible with Sharia.

Besides several documented groups, there have been a number of smaller, loosely affiliated cells that adopt a variety of front names to perpetrate attacks.

== Ideological conflicts with Hamas ==
Gazan Salafi jihadist groups have several general points of unity that pit them at odds with Hamas:

- Opposition to Palestinian nationalism and adherence to pan-Islamism
- Opposition to democracy and other aspects of secularism; Hamas has secular allies, namely the PFLP, DFLP, and Al-Aqsa Martyrs' Brigades.
- Opposition to Shia Islam; some of Hamas' allies belong to the Shia-led Axis of Resistance, including Iran, Hezbollah, and the Houthis.
- Opposition to Hamas' tolerance of perceived liberal attitudes and culture among the Gazan population, including tolerance of music.
- More prominent antisemitic rhetoric. While Hamas itself had previously been accused as antisemitic, its revised charter and some officials (i.e. Khaled Mashal and founder Ahmed Yassin) declared that its main struggle is against Israel and not Jews.

== Background ==
Salafism was first introduced into the Gaza Strip in the 1970s by Palestinian students who had returned from studying abroad at religious schools in Saudi Arabia. The early movement was seen as helping Saudi efforts to propagate Wahhabism (which is often seen as a subset of Salafism) and counter the Iranian Shia Islam of Ruhollah Khomeini. According to journalist Jared Maslin, a number of Salafi groups in the Gaza Strip continue to receive support and funding from the Saudi government today.

The first documented Salafi organization in the Gaza Strip was "Dar al-Kitab wa-al-Sunna" (House of the Book and Sunnah), established in 1975 by Sheikh Yasin al-Astal, which was non-violent and focused on preaching and education. During this time, Gazan Salafis distanced themselves from Palestinian politics and the struggle against Israel. Many Palestinians distrusted them, and as a result they were sometimes marginalized and isolated.

The integration of jihadist ideology into Gazan Salafism began in the 2000s, and appears to have correlated with similar radicalization processes in the Sinai; the first reports on "violent Salafis" date to this period as well. After a period of stagnation, a number of Salafi jihadist groups began to appear in 2005 as Israel prepared for its disengagement from the Gaza Strip.

More groups formed around 2007 in reaction to Hamas taking control of the Gaza Strip.

== Demographics ==
Salafi jihadists in the Gaza Strip are predominantly self-radicalized Palestinians, some of which are former Hamas and Fatah members. A few dozen Salafi jihadist militants in Gaza are of foreign origin, including some Iraqis who entered the territory through Egypt. According to Israeli security officials, Jund Ansar Allah in particular had a few militants from Egypt, Yemen, Pakistan, and Afghanistan.

Overall, this Salafi-jihadi "network" consisted of approximately 4,000–5,000 members and may have as many as 50,000 supporters, according to a 2009 report.

== Documented groups based in Gaza ==
=== Army of Islam ===
Army of Islam جَيش الإسلام Jaysh al-Islām
- Leader: Mumtaz Dughmush
- Dates active: 2005–present
- Allegiance: Islamic State (Wilayat Sinai)
- Active regions: Gaza Strip, Egypt, Syria
- Ideology: Salafi jihadism Sunni Islamism
- Wars: Salafi-jihadist insurgency in the Gaza Strip

Jaysh al-Islam ("The Army of Islam") was founded in late 2005 by the Dogmush clan, a Gazan criminal family. It was initially close to Hamas, and they participated together in the kidnapping of Israeli Defense Forces soldier Gilad Shalit in 2006. The group also carried out the kidnapping of two Fox News journalists in 2006.

The Army of Islam began to turn against Hamas in the months preceding the latter's takeover of Gaza, and organized the kidnapping of British journalist Alan Johnston in March 2007 with the likely intention of embarrassing Hamas. After it seized power in June 2007, Hamas was able to secure Johnston's release, and subsequently began to suppress the Army of Islam's activities, which nonetheless continued sporadically and included attacks on co-ed schools, local Christians, and a YMCA building.

Egyptian authorities stated that the January 2011 Alexandria bombing was carried out by the Army of Islam. The attack, which targeted Coptic Christians, was the deadliest act of violence against the community in a decade, since the Kosheh massacre in 2000 which left 20 Copts dead.

The group participated in the Sinai insurgency alongside Al-Tawhid wal-Jihad and the Mujahideen Shura Council in the Environs of Jerusalem, and smuggled members into the Gaza Strip for training, later sending them back to the Sinai Peninsula to carry out attacks. Army of Islam members linked to the August 2012 Sinai attack have reportedly sought refuge in the Gaza Strip.

In a 2019 interview, the Army of Islam condemned Hamas as an "apostate" group.

=== Jaysh al-Ummah ===
Jaysh al-Ummah ("The Army of the Ummah") formed in June 2007 and took credit for firing three rockets into Israel that month. Unlike other groups, it has avoided claiming responsibility for internal attacks inside Gaza and instead has focused on attacks on Israel. In January 2008 they declared their intent to assassinate American president George W. Bush and stressed their alignment with Al-Qaeda. Abu Hafs al-Maqdisi, the group's leader, condemned Hamas for not implementing Sharia law, and would end up temporarily detained by Hamas himself. Since then, the two groups have had a mutual hostility but refrain from openly fighting.

Jaysh al-Ummah nonetheless fought alongside Hamas in the 2012 Gaza conflict and the 2014 Gaza War. It claimed responsibility for a rocket attack on Israel in 2019 and also claimed to have taken part in the 2021 Israel–Palestine crisis, shooting rockets at Israeli targets. The group has reportedly attacked IDF troops in the Gaza Strip during the 2023 Gaza war, and likely now supports a loose collaboration with Hamas and its allies.

=== Swords of Truth (Suyuf al-Haq) ===
Swords of Truth Arabic: سيوف الحق Suyuf al-Haq
- Other name: "Righteous Swords of Islam" or the "Swords of Islamic Righteousness"
- Leader: Abu Suheib al-Maqdisi
- Headquarters: Beit Hanoun, Gaza Strip
- Active regions: Gaza Strip, Palestine
- Ideology: Islamic theocracy; Anti-democracy; Anti-Christian sentiments

Swords of Truth, also known by their Arabic name Suyuf al-Haq (Arabic: سيوف الحق, romanized: Suyūf al-Ħaq, lit. 'The Swords of Truth' or 'The Swords of Righteousness'), is or was a "veteran" group primarily concentrated in Beit Hanoun in the northern Gaza Strip. It is supposedly led by former Hamas cleric Abu Suheib al-Maqdisi, who left Hamas to protest its decision to take part in the 2006 Palestinian legislative elections.

Suyuf al-Haq has organized attacks against targets they deem immoral or un-Islamic, such as internet cafes, claiming they blew up more than 50 "morally corrupted" businesses in 2007. The group has conducted an acid attack against a young woman dressed "provocatively", attacked a young man listening to music, and threatened Christians. In 2007, the group orchestrated the assassination of senior Palestinian intelligence officer Colonel Jed Tayya, whom it accused of being a Mossad agent. In June 2007, they issued a threat towards Gazan female television broadcasters, warning that they would "cut throats, and from vein to vein, if needed to protect the spirit and moral of this nation", demanding they cease wearing Western-style clothing and makeup. An unnamed Palestinian senior security official accused Hamas of funding the group, which Hamas denied.

=== Jihadia Salafiya ===
Jihadia Salafiya is or was a group mainly known for its threats against Christians. Their leader, Abu Saqer, said in 2007 that Hamas "must work to impose an Islamic rule or it will lose the authority it has and the will of the people" and that Christians "must be ready for Islamic rule if they want to live in peace in Gaza". The group demanded as well an end to Christian missionary activity in the Gaza Strip.

Jihadia Salafiya was also suspected of attacking a United Nations school in the region which hosted a co-ed sporting event.

=== Jund Ansar Allah ===
Jund Ansar Allah ("The Army of God's Supporters") was a Rafah-based group that first surfaced in late 2008. In 2009 the group attempted an attack on the formerly existing Karni border crossing between the Gaza Strip and Israel. Jund Ansar Allah militants holed up in a building in Khan Yunis surrendered in a standoff with Hamas police in July 2009. Hamas officials also blamed the group for the bombings of several internet cafes, and of a wedding party attended by relatives of the West Bank-based Fatah leader, Mohammed Dahlan, in which fifty people were injured. Jund Ansar Allah denied any responsibility for the latter attack, and Fatah leaders blamed Hamas.

In August 2009, Jund Ansar Allah launched a revolt against Hamas, establishing the short-lived "Islamic Emirate of Rafah"; the rebellion was crushed by Hamas after a day of fighting, resulting in the group being virtually destroyed and its leaders killed. Remnants of the group did however claim responsibility for rocket attacks against Israel in October 2009 and March 2010.

=== Al-Tawhid wal-Jihad ===
Jahafil Al-Tawhid Wal-Jihad fi Filastin ("The Armies of Monotheism and Jihad in Palestine") emerged in 2008 and has been responsible for rocket attacks against Israel and attacks against Gazan Christians. The group participated in the Sinai insurgency alongside the Army of Islam and the Mujahideen Shura Council in the Environs of Jerusalem. Notably, it kidnapped and murdered Vittorio Arrigoni, an Italian peace activist who supported the Palestinian cause, in April 2011. The group said that if their imprisoned leader Hesham al-Sa'eedni was not released by Hamas, they would execute Arrigoni. However, he was found dead well before the deadline; Hamas stormed the house where he was being held and successfully fought the abductors, but found him hanged. The Los Angeles Times commented:

[T]he kidnapping raised questions about Hamas' control over Gaza, and it represents the latest example of how smaller, more radical groups in the territory—some with alleged ties to Al Qaeda—are challenging the rule of Hamas, which itself is viewed by Israel and the United States as a terrorist organization. Those groups complain that Hamas has become too moderate.

Following Arrigoni's murder, Hamas launched a successful crackdown on Tawhid al-Jihad.

=== Ansar al-Sunnah ===
Ansar al-Sunnah (Arabic: أنصار السنه) was a group for a 2010 rocket attack on Israel which killed one foreign worker from Thailand.

=== Liwa al-Tawhid and Kataeb al-Tawhid ===
Kataeb al-Tawhid (Arabic: كتائب التوحيد, lit. 'the Monotheism Brigades') is the militant wing of Liwa al-Tawhid (Arabic: لواء التوحيد). They were a group that emerged in 2009. It claimed a cadre of several hundred fighters and an expertise in “RPG rockets, kalashnikovs, explosive devices, and mines, but we are trained in everything, including martyrdom.” “Liwa al-Tawhid” is an extension of the “al-Tawhid and wal-Jihad Brigades” and “Jund Ansar Allah”.

=== Jaljalat ===
Jaljalat ("Thunder") is or was a "loosely-structured" group aligned with Al-Qaeda and composed largely of former Hamas personnel. The group voiced its condemnation of Hamas and organized two bombing attacks against Hamas government buildings in August 2009 as revenge against the suppression of Jund Ansar Allah earlier that month. In September 2009, Jaljalat revealed that it had attempted to assassinated former US president Jimmy Carter and former UK prime minister Tony Blair, but the plot had been foiled by Hamas. Hamas captured the group's leader, Mahmoud Taleb, in October 2009.

There is a debate over whether Jaljalat actually exists as a distinct group. Gazan Salafi jihadis have frequently denied its existence, and Hamas historically used the term to refer to all Salafi jihadists in Gaza. In a 2010 interview, a Salafi jihadist in Rafah claimed:

There is no entity called Jaljalat. It is not an organisation. What you have to understand is that even the other names that you use – Tawhid wa al-Jihad, Ansar al-Sunna, and the like – are not really separate organisations. All the Salafis will use these different organisational names at different times and for different operations. But we are all the same, with the same goals and the same teachings. One day you and several others launch some mortars and declare that it was Ansar al-Sunna. Another day you and a few different people fire a rocket and say it was Jaysh al-Umma. These different names are adopted only because of the pressure we face from the government.

=== Sheikh Omar Hadid Brigade ===
The Sheikh Omar Hadid Brigade surfaced in 2015 and is affiliated with IS. The group was responsible for the Askhelon rocket attacks into Israel that year. Hamas raided the home of their leader Yunis Hunnar in June 2015; he was shot dead while resisting arrest.

=== Mujahideen Shura Council in the Environs of Jerusalem ===
The Mujahideen Shura Council in the Environs of Jerusalem (MSC) was formed in 2011 or 2012 by Hisham al-Saedni to unify Tawhid wal-Jihad, Ansar al-Sunnah, and several other Salafi jihadist groups. It declared allegiance to IS in 2014. By 2022, according to the United States, MSC had been inactive for years.

=== Jama'at Ansar al-Dawla al-Islamiyya fi Bayt al-Maqdis ===
Jama'at Ansar al-Dawla al-Islamiyya fi Bayt al-Maqdis ("Supporters of the Islamic State in Jerusalem") was a group that assassinated Saber Siam, a Hamas commander, in a car bombing, and fired mortar shells at an Al-Qassam Brigades headquarters in Khan Yunis.

=== Aknaf Beit al-Makdis ===
Aknaf Beit al-Makdis (Arabic: أكناف بيت المقدس) was a IS-affiliated group that launched two rocket attacks on Sderot, Israel in 2016.

=== Katibat al-Sheikh al-Emireen ===
Katibat al-Sheikh al-Emireen was an IS-affiliated group that launched Katyusha rockets at Nir Oz in Israel on May 11, 2021 during 2021 Israel–Palestine crisis

=== Lions of Monotheism ===
The Lions of Monotheism was a group that firebombed five Christian churches in September 2006 in response to the controversy over Pope Benedict XVI's comments on Islam. While one of the church attacks occurred in the Gaza Strip, the other four were carried out in Nablus, in the West Bank. Hamas leader Ismail Haniyeh, who was at that time prime minister of the Palestinian Authority, condemned the attacks.

=== Masada al-Mujahideen ===
Masada al-Mujahideen was a group associated with Al-Qaeda which was notable for its focus on starting forest fires with arson attacks. It clashed with Israel, Hamas, and even Jaysh al-Ummah in the early 2010s. It claimed responsibility for more than a dozen forest fires inside Israeli territory between 2010 and 2013. The group even went so far as to claim they were behind forest fires in the United States in 2012 and 2013, namely in the states of Arizona and Nevada, but their claims were disproven by American officials.

=== Jaish al Mu'minun ===
Jaish al-Mu'minun was also known as "Al-Qaeda in Palestine" and carried out the killing of Rami Ayyad, owner of a Christian bookshop in Gaza City.

=== Jund Allah ===
Jund Allah (Arabic: جندالله) was reportedly the first ever Salafi jihadist group to carry out an attack in the Gaza Strip, in 2001, though the exact date and target of this attack is unknown. It later carried out attacks with Suyuf al-Haq and other groups in the turmoil that followed the 2006 elections.

== Alleged Salafi jihadist groups ==
=== Popular Forces ===
The Popular Forces, also known as the Anti-Terror Service, is an anti-Hamas Palestinian armed group in the Gaza Strip formerly led by Yasser Abu Shabab. It is Israeli-backed and allegedly linked to IS.

The group, which has been described as a gang or militia, is made up of approximately 300 men who operate in eastern Rafah. Israeli support for the Popular Forces was only revealed in June 2025, but the group has been active since the beginning of the Rafah offensive in May 2024. Israeli officials acknowledged sending weapons to the Popular Forces, as part of a program of arming and supporting anti-Hamas elements and clans in the Gaza Strip.

During the ongoing Gaza war, Abu Shabab has claimed that the Popular Forces has cleared Hamas forces out of eastern Rafah. The group stated that it protects civilians from “the terror" of the "Hamas government” and from “aid thieves". The group has looted humanitarian aid entering the Gaza Strip.

The Times of Israel reported that before the Gaza war, the group was known for smuggling weapons to IS and other militant groups during the Sinai insurgency. Middle East Eye reported that "key figures" in the Popular Forces have links to IS; one commander, Ghassan al-Dahini, was formerly an official in Jaysh al-Islam (which had declared allegiance to IS in 2015), and another commander, Issam al-Nabahin, was a member of Wilayah Sinai in the mid-2010s. Abu Shabab has denied the allegations, labelling them as propaganda.

=== Palestine District ===
On 29 August 2025, the IDF stated that an airstrike conducted several days earlier in Bureij had targeted and killed Muhammad Abd Al-Aziz Abu Zubaida. According to the IDF report, Abu Zubaida was the leader of an Islamic State branch called the Palestine District, said to be active in Gaza Strip, the West Bank, and the Sinai Peninsula. The report also claimed that Palestine District operatives had been involved in fighting Israeli troops during the Gaza war.

Major General Mohamed Abdel Wahid, former deputy head of Egypt's General Intelligence Service, said in response that there is no Islamic State presence in the Gaza Strip besides lone wolves, and that the Israeli claims are propaganda aiming to link Hamas to Islamic State. He also stated that the allegations of a current IS presence in Gaza were not based on any facts on the ground and lacked independent and reliable evidence.

== See also ==
- Islamism in the Gaza Strip
- The Sinai insurgency in the Gaza Strip
- Fatah–Hamas conflict
- Islamic fundamentalism
- Palestinian Joint Operations Room
