= Kidnapping of Alan Johnston =

Kidnapping of a British journalist

- Part of the Salafi jihadist insurgency in the Gaza Strip
- Date: 12 March–4 July 2007
- Location: Gaza City, Gaza Strip, Palestine
- Type: Kidnapping
- Motive: Hostage diplomacy and coercive negotiation
- Perpetrator: Army of Islam
- Outcome: Released after 114 days in captivity

The kidnapping of Alan Johnston, a British journalist for the BBC, by the Army of Islam in Gaza City took place on 12 March 2007, following which Johnston was held in captivity for 114 days.

His captivity led to many protests in the Palestinian territories, as well as the British government meeting a Hamas member for the first time. On 15 April, unconfirmed reports claiming that he had been murdered surfaced, later declared by Palestinian intelligence sources to be false. A tape claiming to be from Johnston's kidnappers surfaced on 8 May, leading to renewed hope that he would soon be released, and three weeks later a Hamas spokesperson spoke of his hope that Johnston would be freed quickly. Johnston then appeared in a video released online by his alleged kidnappers on 1 June.

Hopes were raised for his release in mid-June after Hamas took full control of Gaza and set a deadline for his release, but on 24 June a video of him wearing what he said was an explosive belt was released along with a warning that if attempts were made to rescue him by force it would be detonated. However, on 4 July, Johnston was freed, and left Gaza for Jerusalem.

== Kidnapping and captivity ==
On 12 March 2007, Johnston's car was found abandoned on a street, shortly after he left his office to drive home. He had entered Gaza from Israel earlier in the day, where he had been for a dental appointment. A business card belonging to Johnston was found at the scene, identifying him as having been in the car, at the time of his kidnapping. The BBC was alerted to his disappearance when he did not make an arranged telephone call.

According to Palestinian police, four armed men were spotted near Johnston's car, and Johnston is believed to have been abducted at gunpoint. A state of emergency was declared with checkpoints set up to find Johnston, who was in the final weeks of his posting to Gaza, where he had been stationed for three years.

There were some reports that negotiations had begun to try to secure Johnston's release, although the BBC strenuously emphasised that it could not independently verify reports that Johnston had been kidnapped. A week after his disappearance, the BBC admitted that it seemed certain now that he had been kidnapped.

On 21 March, Israeli sources reported that Johnston may have been taken by the same groups that captured Gilad Shalit in June 2006. However, this was strongly denied by both the Popular Resistance Committees.

26 March marked the fact that his kidnapping was now the longest-ever of a foreigner in Gaza since abductions began happening in the Gaza Strip, which led to renewed calls for his release.

In the midst of his third week in captivity, news agencies began reporting on speculation that Johnston had been kidnapped by a powerful Gaza family with criminal connections, and which was willing to switch support to the other faction in the Palestinian Territories should one displease them. It then emerged that the family might be holding Johnston as a bargaining chip who would be released in return for ten Hamas gunmen who killed members of the family.

On the day marking the fourth week of his disappearance, a London-based Arab newspaper, Al-Hayat, reported that Gaza authorities were looking into the possibility that Johnston might have staged his own disappearance after hearing that he was soon to be fired. At first, the BBC refused to comment on the report, before issuing a statement, calling on press not to run the article in question "given that there is absolutely no truth to it", adding that "there is no truth in any suggestion that Alan Johnston may have staged his own kidnap, nor that the BBC was about to dismiss him."

Early on 9 May local time, the BBC reported that al-Jazeera in Gaza had received a tape which was purported to be from Johnston's kidnappers. It was sent to the station by a group calling itself the Army of Islam, despite earlier claims by the group that it had not committed the kidnapping. The tape contained still photos, including one of Johnston's BBC card, and demanded "that Britain free our prisoners, particularly Sheikh Abu Qatada, the Palestinian." The BBC said it was investigating the tape and "welcome any sign that Alan may be alive", adding its hope that the tape release meant that Johnston would soon be released.

=== First month ===
The Palestinian National Authority condemned the kidnapping, and vowed to "bring the criminals to justice", calling the abduction "despicable". The Foreign Press Association issued an appeal for Johnston's release, while both Hamas and Fatah also called for Johnston to be freed. Reporters Without Borders (RSF) also voiced their concern at the apparent abduction, blaming it on the "impunity" that no-one involved with prior kidnappings had been convicted that "[encouraged]" his kidnappers to act.

On 15 March, the BBC's Middle East bureau chief Simon Wilson issued a statement in Gaza thanking Ismail Haniyeh, Mahmoud Abbas and the Palestinian government for trying to help resolve the situation. He also issued a new plea for information on Johnston's whereabouts. In London, the Muslim Council of Britain also put forward an appeal for the release of Johnston, calling on Abbas and Haniyeh to do their utmost to secure Johnston's freedom, while over 20 Palestinian journalists held a rally on 17 March outside parliament in Gaza in support of Johnston. The rally was also attended by Information Minister Mustafa Barghouti and Wilson. Barghouti said: "We are opposed to the kidnapping of foreign journalists who serve the Palestinian cause."

A week after Johnston went missing, his father made a televised appeal for his release. Speaking from Argyll, Graham Johnston called on his son's abductors to "let my son go, now, today". Wilson said that the fact that there had been no information on Johnston for over a week had been "disappointing", adding that efforts made to find Johnston would have to be redoubled. He also noted that the BBC's only request was to have "some firm information" on Johnston. Deputy Director General of the BBC Mark Byford also called for people with influence to secure Johnston's release, while BBC staff in London held a rally in support of Johnston.

RSF invited Arabic-language news media and bloggers to post banners on their websites that called for Johnston to be freed. RSF also noted that the "silence" surrounding Johnston's abduction was "particularly worrying".

The Palestinian Journalists Union in Gaza observed a 24-hour strike on 20 March to protest against Johnston's abduction, and threatened to "escalate" its protests until Johnston was released. Foreign and local journalists in Ramallah, West Bank, had held a sit-in a day earlier, at which Barghouti again condemned the kidnapping.

The BBC said it had received "assurances" about the well-being of Johnston, but repeated that it had "no firm knowledge" of his condition. It also thanked journalists who demonstrated in a show of support both in the Middle East and back in the UK. European Union foreign policy representative Javier Solana told the BBC on 20 March that the EU was doing all it could to try to establish Johnston's whereabouts. Solana added that the EU had been involved since the day of the kidnapping. British Foreign Secretary Margaret Beckett told Parliament that London was also doing everything it could, and had brought the issue up with Mahmoud Abbas, saying that Abbas had given her assurances that finding Johnston was "very much" a goal of the Palestinian authorities. Journalists also protested in front of Abbas's office to demand that more be done to deal with the situation.

Protests continued on 22 March, demanding more protection of journalists and more be done to prevent violation of press freedoms. Ahmed Abdel Rahman, advisor to Abbas for the PLO, told protesting journalists in Ramallah that there were "indications of an imminent release". Twelve days into Johnston's abduction, the Bishop of Lichfield Jonathan Gledhill asked churchgoers to pray for Johnston's release, saying that people were grateful for "brave journalists" like Johnston.

More than 100 people held a rally for Johnston's release thirteen days into his captivity. Simon Wilson again urged those with influence to "work tirelessly" to obtain Johnston's freedom. On the day marking the second week since Johnston went missing, Gaza reporters held another strike in solidarity with Johnston. The beginning of Johnston's third week in captivity also led RSF to press the Arab League to issue a new appeal for Johnston's release at an upcoming summit.

In response to the RSF appeal, at the end of the two-day summit Saudi Foreign Minister Prince Saud al-Faisal condemned the kidnapping, adding that he hoped the kidnappers would soon release Johnston, saying that this was "certainly ... not something that anybody, anybody would approve of" and that Johnston was just "doing his job".

Amnesty International and Cardiff University (which Johnston attended) also both issued calls for Johnston's release. The deputy director of the university's journalism centre noted that the kidnapping "deprived Palestine of an objective reporter relaying its news to the West."

A new three-day strike was planned by journalists in the lead-up to the fourth week of Johnston's kidnapping. The strike included a ban on covering all government activities and the Palestinian Authority in general. Simultaneous demonstrations and protests were also planned for 2 April in both Gaza and Ramallah. On the day itself, over three hundred journalists held a demonstration in Gaza with their mouths tied and gagged. They then marched to the city's government area. Another such protest was held in Ramallah in front of Abbas' office.

The three-day strike meant that a meeting between United States Speaker of the House Nancy Pelosi (D-CA) and Abbas was boycotted by the local media. That same day, UNESCO Director-General Koïchiro Matsuura added his voice to those calling for Johnston's release. He noted that the situation was "increasingly disturbing", and asked authorities to "do their utmost to obtain his release as quickly as possible".

On 4 April, the protesting journalists forced the cancellation of a rare meeting of Parliament in Gaza after the entrance to the Parliament building was blocked by the protesters. Some of the lawmakers then stood and listened to the protest. The next day, Britain's Consul-General in Jerusalem Richard Makepeace met with Prime Minister Haniyeh, breaking a ban by the European Union on contacts with Hamas. British diplomats stressed that the meeting was only to discuss Johnston's kidnapping and did not "represent a change of policy". Makepeace's office emphasised that the meeting was "strictly for humanitarian reasons", while Reuters quoted some diplomats as saying that it was generally agreed that the boycott of Hamas could be relaxed in emergencies like kidnappings.

Palestinian children took part in a demonstration on 6 April to call for Johnston's release. The children held banners and carried his picture when demonstrating in the streets. Johnston was also spoken of at Friday prayers. Fresh protests were held in Ramallah, Nablus, Jenin and Gaza City the next day by Palestinian journalists, who held banners condemning Johnston's abduction. The Palestinian Cabinet held a special meeting the next day to discuss Johnston's case, and directed that "all necessary measures" should be taken to secure Johnston's freedom.

On Easter Sunday, 8 April 2007, Archbishop of York John Sentamu included Johnston in his Easter prayers, calling him a "symbol of ensuring the freedom of the press is not violated". It was reported the same day that about one thousand British journalists would send protest emails to Abbas over the continued abduction of Johnston.

Four weeks after Johnston's disappearance, his BBC colleagues once again got together in London to show support for the missing reporter. The BBC's head of news-gathering, Fran Unsworth, commented that Johnston was "incarcerated", and voiced concerns about Johnston's mental state and general health, adding that "the longer it goes on the more concerned that we become".

The Palestinian government apologised again on 10 April that Johnston was still missing. Mustafa Barghouti repeated that the government was making every effort to find Johnston, and said that the government was "deeply sorry", adding that the kidnapping was "detrimental to our national cause."

=== Alan Johnston Day of Action ===
On 12 April, a full month after Johnston was last seen, the BBC held an "Alan Johnston Day of Action" with events in London, Scotland and the Palestinian Territories to mark the day. Director-General of the BBC Mark Thompson gave a news conference in Ramallah, and made another appeal for Johnston's release. He said that Johnston "had formed many strong friendships", and was "held in great affection and regard by those who know him." He repeated Fran Unsworth's comments made days earlier, saying that the BBC was "increasingly concerned about the physical and mental toll" of Johnston's "incarceration". Thompson also said that "Alan had been looking forward to returning to his staff post in London in the BBC World Service newsroom" because "Gaza [had] become an increasingly difficult and chaotic place for journalists to operate in safely", seemingly dispelling rumours that he had staged his own kidnapping because he did not want to be transferred. He also thanked the Palestinian Journalists' Syndicate for "highlighting Alan's suffering", and the people of Gaza.

Johnston's father Graham once again issued a new plea to the kidnappers to free his son. In an open letter, the senior Johnston addressed his son's kidnappers, telling them to "please think about what this is doing to my family." Again, he asked the kidnappers to "please let my son go now, today." Addressing his son, he said that the family "wanted you to know how distressed and sorry we all are that you were taken," adding that despite warnings from his son that being kidnapped was a possibility, "when it came, it was still a considerable shock." He ended the open letter by saying that "all our heartfelt warmest fondest love is sent to you from all your family and in the fervent hope that you will be released unharmed."

BBC World, BBC News 24, Al Jazeera English and Sky News agreed to simulcast a special programme dedicated to bringing the plight of Johnston to people. The thirty-minute broadcast, fronted by Jeremy Bowen, contained reports from Al Jazeera, Sky and CNN International. Bowen began by noting that "about the only good thing to come out of the last month is the way Alan's colleagues, especially here in the occupied Palestinian territories, have rallied around him." It was the first such effort made jointly by global news networks.

Reporters Without Borders also organised a rally at Trafalgar Square in central London in support of the missing journalist. The rally was attended by Johnston's parents. A rally was also held in Gaza, calling on the Palestinian government to do more. In a statement, RSF stated that it was "unacceptable that a journalist should be used as a bargaining chip in an abduction", and asked "What are the authorities waiting for to obtain his release?"

=== Second month ===
On 12 April, United Nations Secretary General Ban Ki-moon issued a call for Johnston's release, stating that his kidnappers "should release him unconditionally and immediately." The Secretary-General extended his sympathies to Johnston's family and promised to do all in his power to secure Johnston's release.

16 April marked the fifth week since Johnston's disappearance. Despite unconfirmed claims of his execution, new vigils and protests were held for Johnston. BBC staff held its weekly vigils for Johnston, led by Mark Thompson, who confirmed that the BBC was still looking for clarification about Johnston's well-being. Thompson also praised the reporter's family. Journalists also held protests in Beirut, Lebanon, and in Brussels, Belgium outside the European Commission building.

A new protest was held by Palestinian journalists outside the Gaza Parliament on 17 April. However, armed guards outside the building turned violent against the protesters, hitting them with their rifles, leading one journalist to comment that "we came peacefully, but we are being assaulted now." Three journalists were injured. RSF condemned the violence, saying that it was "outraged by this violence against journalists who had gone to express their fears and emotion about Johnston's fate."

On 18 April, Marwan Barghouti, a Fatah leader in prison in Israel called on Johnston's kidnappers to free the journalist "from my cell, and in the name of 10,000 prisoners in the occupation jails". Aidan White, general secretary of the International Federation of Journalists, announced that he would visit Gaza to deliver a letter to the Palestinian Authority, signed by 200 European MPs, which asked the PA to "make every effort" to ensure Johnston was freed. The 200 MEPs also called on the European Union to take stronger action. The European Parliament would later unanimously support a resolution on 25 April urging the immediate release of Johnston, with the resolution's proposer saying it sent "a strong political signal" for his release.

On 23 April, various prayer meetings and vigils were held for the missing reporter, exactly six weeks after he went missing. A vigil was held in Islamabad, Pakistan, and an inter-religious service was held at a church in London. The London vigil was attended by a senior rabbi at the west London synagogue, the vicar at the church, Reverend Nicholas Holtam, as well as the chairman of the United Kingdom Muslim Council for Religious and Racial Harmony. The missing journalist's sister also attended the weekly vigil with BBC Scotland staff in Glasgow.

The next day, Palestinian deputy prime minister Azzam al-Ahmad told Richard Makepeace that Johnston was "in good health" and emphasised that the "government is fully co-ordinating with the presidency and all security services to pursue the extensive efforts to release Johnston". New protests were held by the National Union of Journalists in London, and by foreign journalists on both ends of the Erez Crossing in Gaza and Israel. In Asia, a protest was held in Bangkok, Thailand on the 49th day since Johnston's disappearance. Azzam al-Ahmad repeated Palestinian claims that Johnston was "alive" when meeting with visiting MEPs the same day. However, at this point there had still not been any direct confirmation of Johnston's condition. Later that day, al-Ahmad told a press conference that Johnston's kidnappers had made new demands, all of which had been rejected, and added that the negotiations were at a "sensitive stage".

Addressing the United Nations General Assembly, Secretary-General Ban again said that he wanted to "plead for the immediate release of the BBC journalist Alan Johnston, abducted in Gaza." In London, a moment of silence was observed at the Sony Radio Academy Awards ceremony, and John Humphrys, who won the award for news journalist of the year, said that Johnston and other BBC correspondents in danger zones deserved the award more than he did.

On 2 May, it was revealed that the British Government rejected a proposal by the Palestinian Authority to use force in a possible rescue attempt to free Johnston, due to worries about his safety in such a situation. Ismail Haniyeh also said that progress had been made in negotiations with Johnston's kidnappers, and the kidnappers had lowered their demands for his release. The same day, British Prime Minister Tony Blair was questioned in Parliament about British efforts to free the journalist. Lee Scott, a British MP, had called on Prime Minister Blair to use the time before he stepped down from office to try to free Johnston as well as Gilad Shalit. Blair told the House of Commons that there was "no conceivable reason for him (Johnston) to be kept", and that the Government would "continue to do everything we can to facilitate" Johnston's release. In Ireland, top Catholic and Muslim leaders also called for his immediate release.

World Press Freedom Day, 3 May, was Johnston's 52nd day in captivity. Gatherings were held worldwide for the missing journalist, with vigils in London, Beijing and Jakarta, Indonesia, and a rally outside United Nations headquarters in New York City. Asha-Rose Migiro, the United Nations Deputy Secretary-General, said that there was "no cause... served" by the continued detention of Johnston, and a minute's silence was held. The rally at the UN was also attended by UN officials and journalists. At the candlelight vigil in Jakarta, a message from Johnston's father was read out by a British embassy staff member, and it said in part that the family was "overwhelmed" with the support it had received. A minute's silence was also observed at a candlelight vigil in Beijing. The same day, at the Natali Prize awards ceremony for news articles on human rights and democracy, European Commissioner for Development & Humanitarian Aid Louis Michel joined calls for Johnston's release.

A news conference was held by Reporters Without Borders on the same day, which brought together former hostages in Iraq, Afghanistan and Gaza. Steve Centanni, who was held hostage for two weeks in Gaza in 2006, said that his thoughts were with Johnston, and ten top representatives of Europe's Muslims condemned the kidnapping and called for his release.

The start of Johnston's ninth week in captivity came with reports in a Palestinian newspaper that Johnston's kidnappers had set three requirements for his release. They demanded a plot of land, a $5 million ransom, and the release of Sajida Mubarak Atrous al-Rishawi, imprisoned in Jordan for attempting to carry out a suicide bombing in the 2005 Amman bombings. However, the reports also noted that negotiations for his release remained difficult and that he would not likely be released soon.

Richard Makepeace met a second time with Palestinian Prime Minister Haniyeh over Johnston's continued incommunicado situation on 8 May. He described the meeting as part of "continuous contacts over this humanitarian case", adding that the "unfortunate incident is of great concern to the British government."

Canadian journalists held a protest outside CBC headquarters in Toronto on 10 May to mark Johnston's 60th day in captivity. Many seasoned Canadian journalists spoke of the need to free Johnston, and commented on Johnston's journalism and the deteriorating situation in Gaza, with Brian Stewart commenting that "we have finally reached the end of the line ... enough is enough."

A rally was held outside the equivalent of a Palestinian embassy in Paris on 11 May, attended by RSF activists, BBC staff and the Palestinian representative to France. The representative, Hind Khoury, called the kidnapping a "cowardly act" and re-emphasised that the authorities in the Palestinian Authority were doing their best every day to get Johnston freed unharmed.

==== Claim of execution ====
On 15 April, one day before the fifth week since his disappearance, a previously unknown militant Palestinian group claiming to be linked to al-Qaeda claimed that it had executed him. The group vowed to release a video of the execution, further claiming in a statement that they "were surprised by the position of the Palestinian Authority, which attempted to hide the case as much as it could and to present the case in an untruthful manner, leading us unfortunately to kill the journalist".

The BBC and the Foreign Office immediately confirmed to Agence France-Presse that they were both "urgently" investigating the reports, and the BBC added that it was "deeply concerned about what it is hearing", highlighting the growing concern for the safety of Alan Johnston. However, the BBC also emphasised that the claims were "rumour with no independent verification". A spokesman for 10 Downing Street said that the British government was "working closely with the Palestinian Authority" and "urgently seeking information from them".

The Palestinian Interior Ministry raised doubts about the claims, and said that they believed that Johnston was still being held by someone else, and this declaration was an attempt to pressure the Palestinian government. The claims also led to concern among Palestinian journalists that Johnston may have been injured in the kidnapping, and the kidnappers were now looking for reasons to kill the reporter.

Johnston's parents urged the kidnappers to "end [their] ordeal", describing the incident as a "desperately worrying time". Speculation then emerged that Johnston's kidnappers may have sold the captive on to a third party. Reporters Without Borders also expressed "deep concern" about Johnston's fate, saying that the reports of his death "deeply [disturbing]" but also advised caution "as long as there is no evidence confirming that Johnston has been murdered."

However, a ransom demand was issued on 17 April, which seemingly conflicted with the claims that Johnston had been killed. Asharq Alawsat reported that Johnston's kidnappers wanted US$5 million for his release. On 19 April, President of the Palestinian Authority Mahmoud Abbas told reporters his intelligence services had confirmed that the journalist was still alive, which both the reporter's family and the BBC described as "good news".

=== Third month ===
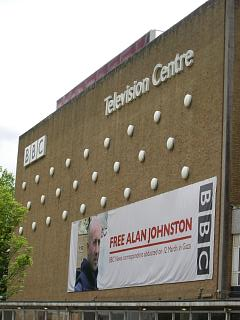
Alan Johnston banner at BBC Television Centre

On 12 May, the second month to the day of the kidnap, Archbishop of York John Sentamu appealed to Johnston's captors to set him free in an appeal broadcast on al-Jazeera. The International Press Institute also repeated its call at its annual global meeting in Istanbul for Johnston's release.

The next day, Iran joined international condemnations of the kidnap, with a foreign ministry spokesman, Mohammad Ali Hosseini, saying that kidnapping was not acceptable to Iran, and that Iran rejected kidnapping as a "matter of principle."

Johnston's 45th birthday, on 17 May, saw gatherings of journalists and politicians at rallies worldwide, in Hong Kong, Tehran, Ramallah and Moscow. The British Government also confirmed that it was holding discussions with an arrested Islamic cleric, Abu Qatada, whom Johnston's alleged kidnappers demanded be freed, after Qatada offered to travel to Gaza to help free Johnston. The BBC had earlier reacted to Qatada's offer by saying that they "[welcomed] any assistance from any individual who might be in a position to influence the release of Alan Johnston".

The BBC also broadcast special reports, interviews and birthday greetings to the missing journalist on BBC radio and television in the possibility that Johnston had access to either.

A Palestinian government spokesman of Hamas said on 27 May that he had hope for Johnston to soon be released. Ghazi Hamad said that he "[knew]" Johnston to be "well and healthy", adding that no-one "has tried to harm or hurt him". Hamad also said that he hoped "to make [Johnston's release] very, very fast."

On 29 May, a Sudanese al-Jazeera cameraman who had been held without charge at Guantanamo Bay since 2001 issued a statement through his lawyer asking for Johnston's release. Sami Mohy El Din Muhammed Al Hajj's letter compared his extrajudicial detention by the US to Johnston's captivity. "What the Americans are doing to me is very, very wrong ... this is not a lesson that Muslims should copy."

On 1 June, a video was released by the Palestinian Army of Islam saying that it was holding Johnston. Johnston appeared in the video and said that he had been treated well and was in good health, but it is unclear when the video was taken, and whether he said what he did under duress.

=== Fourth month ===
On 16 June, after Hamas had taken full control of Gaza following attacks on Fatah positions, a Hamas spokesman told a news conference that it had told the Army of Islam to free Johnston "immediately" and had "warned against not setting him free", describing Johnston as the Palestinians' guest.

A spokesman claiming to speak for the Army of Islam said that while there had been "developments" in discussions, "if things get worse we will get closer to God by killing this journalist."

Reporters Without Borders immediately expressed its concern at the threat to kill Johnston, saying in a press release that they were "very worried" about "the irrational demands being made by Johnston's abductors, the radicalisation of their position and their threat to kill him". Hamas reacted to the claim by issuing an ultimatum against the kidnappers, warning that it would use military force to free Johnston if he was not freed by the end of Monday, 18 June, to which the Foreign Office expressed deep concern. Kim Howells of the Foreign Office noted that the situation had to be "handled with great delicacy", and that "we hope that they are not using this as some sort of publicity stunt to win favour with some elements in the West." Johnston himself, however, said he felt they had been "...the key factor in creating the conditions in which I could be freed."

Hamas leader Mahmoud al-Zahar announced on 19 June, Johnston's 99th day in captivity, that he had secured a promise from the Army of Islam to release Johnston by 25 June, after Hamas extended its ultimatum for his release. This news came ahead of planned global events by the BBC and RSF to mark Johnston's 100th day in captivity.

The Jerusalem Post reported on 22 June that Johnston had not yet been freed because the leader of the group claiming to hold Johnston wanted assurances that he and his clan members would not be killed. Mumtaz Dagmoush and a brother of his were wanted by Hamas on charges of being involved with the murder of Hamas members. However, a Hamas source told the Jerusalem Post that "we will negotiate with them about their safety only after they release the journalist".

On 24 June, Ismail Haniyeh, a senior political leader of Hamas, said that Johnston had been seen on video with explosives strapped around his waist. The BBC confirmed that it was "aware" of the video, and appealed again for his release, saying that it was "very distressing for Alan's family and colleagues to see him being threatened in this way".

On the day 16 weeks into Johnston's captivity, Hamas announced that it had arrested members of the Army of Islam, saying that the arrests took place since "peaceful means failed to free" Johnston. It also announced that an Army of Islam spokesman was among those detained after he allegedly shot at Hamas militants. Two days later Hamas forces began surrounding the area the Dugmush clan was known to control in Gaza. Whilst members of Hamas' Executive Forces claimed that the operation was the start of an attempt to free Johnston by force, the BBC reiterated its request that the journalist not be freed by military action.

=== Print and online petitions ===
To mark the twenty-first day of Johnston's kidnapping, three hundred British media personalities signed an advertisement, organised by the BBC, that was published in The Guardian. The advertisement states that the signatories "demand the immediate release of BBC Gaza correspondent, Alan Johnston". The advertisement "[asks] again that everyone with influence on this situation increase their efforts, to ensure that Alan is freed quickly and unharmed."

It was signed by most editors of British national newspapers, including Alan Rusbridger, Robert Thomson, John Witherow, Patience Wheatcroft, Will Lewis, Paul Dacre and Richard Wallace. Other signatories included David Dimbleby, Sir David Frost, Jon Snow, Christiane Amanpour and Al Jazeera's Wadah Khanfar.

That same day, the BBC news website created an online version of the petition to allow people from across the world to sign it. The petition closed a few days later on 5 April. The petition was later re-opened on 12 April, a full month after Johnston's kidnapping.

On 3 July, the online petition registered its 200,000th signatory calling for Johnston's release.

== Release ==
On 4 July, Johnston was freed by his captors and handed over to Hamas officials. Johnston said he was "tired", but "in good health", and thanked those who pushed for his release. He also confirmed that he had access to the BBC World Service for much of his captivity and had heard the worldwide calls for his release on shows like World Have Your Say and Newshour. He described his captivity as an "appalling experience".

Johnston met with Haniyeh immediately after being freed before leaving for Jerusalem. He later also met Mahmoud Abbas and Salam Fayyad in Ramallah before returning home, arriving in London on 7 July from Tel Aviv.

=== Reactions ===
Reaction to the news from around the world that Johnston had been freed was positive:

- Johnston's father Graham described the family as being "absolutely overjoyed" after receiving the phone call from the BBC that Johnston had been freed.
- The BBC said in a statement that they were "delighted and extremely relieved" that Johnston had been freed safely, and thanked "all of those who worked tirelessly – here and in the wider Middle East – to secure his freedom." Sir Michael Lyons, chairman of the BBC, praised Johnston's "remarkable courage".
- Gordon Brown, British Prime Minister, said that he and the whole country would "welcome the news" that Johnston had been freed, while British Foreign Secretary David Miliband described abductions as "an abhorrent crime" and recognised the role of Mahmoud Abbas, Ismail Haniyeh and Hamas in achieving Johnston's freedom.
- A senior aide to Abbas, Yasser Abd Rabbo, described the release as having been staged by Hamas and the Army of Islam as a public relations exercise. Abbas himself said that he was "very happy for the release of our friend".
- Ismail Haniyeh described Johnston as "the friend of the Palestinian people", emphasising that freeing him had been Hamas' main priority. Hamas political leader Khaled Meshaal said that "as Palestinians, [we are] very happy to reach this point, which is the release of Mr Alan Johnston."
- Israeli Foreign Ministry spokesman Mark Regev expressed solidarity with Johnston's family, saying that Israel knew "how difficult it has been for his family and friends", and expressed hope that Gilad Shalit would similarly soon be freed.
- Bernard Kouchner, French Foreign Minister, said he was "delighted" with Johnston's release, and noted that Johnston's release ought to "encourage all of the parties concerned to commit themselves to creating a climate favourable to the resumption of peace negotiations".
- The UN Secretary-General Ban Ki-moon released a statement through his spokesman, in which he said he was "profoundly relieved" that Johnston had been freed, and commended Johnston's "dignity and resilience in captivity".
- Johnston himself has expressed a desire to "return to obscurity" now that he is released.

== See also ==
- 2006 Fox journalists kidnapping
- John McCarthy
- Yvonne Ridley
- Olaf Wiig
- 2014 kidnapping and murder of Israeli teenagers
- Kidnapping and murder of Vittorio Arrigoni (captors arrested and sentenced to prison terms by Hamas, 2011)
