= March 2010 Gaza–Israel clashes =

2010 Gaza clashes
- Part of the Israeli–Palestinian conflict and the Gaza–Israel conflict
- Map of the Gaza Strip
Date	26–27 March 2010
Location	Gaza Strip, Palestine
Result	Israeli withdrawal from Gaza

Belligerents
Israel	Palestine; Hamas; Palestinian Islamic Jihad; Jaljalat

Commanders and leaders
Benjamin Netanyahu; Ehud Barak (Israel) Maj. Eliraz Peretz X	Ismail Haniyeh (Hamas) Mohammed Deif

Units involved
Israel Defense Forces; Golani Brigade	(Hamas) Al-Qassam Brigades (Palestinian Islamic Jihad) Al-Quds Brigades

Strength
(Israel) Unknown	(Palestine) Unknown

Casualties and losses
(Israel) 2 soldiers killed (Israel) 3 soldiers wounded	(Palestine) 3 fighters killed (Palestine) 2 fighters wounded
- (Palestine) 1 Palestinian civilian killed (Palestine) 12 Palestinian civilians wounded

The 2010 Gaza clashes were military clashes in the Gaza Strip between Israeli forces and Palestinian armed groups that occurred in March 2010.

== Background ==
Tensions between Israel and Hamas ran high after the Gaza War, although fighting ended after a cease-fire was signed. No serious armed incidents had taken place before these clashes. However, tensions ran high, especially with the Mossad suspected of assassinating Hamas commander Mahmoud al-Mabhouh in Dubai, and a rocket launched from Gaza killing a Thai farm worker working an Israeli field. The Israeli naval blockade of Gaza was also still in place, while rockets continued to be fired at Israeli cities and towns.

== Clashes ==
The fighting began on March 26, 2010, when a team of soldiers from the Israel Defense Forces (IDF) entered the Gaza Strip. The soldiers were from the elite Golani Brigade, and had entered after several men placing what appeared to be explosives on the border fence. Gunmen then attacked the soldiers with mortars and gunfire, as well as an explosive device. Two Israeli soldiers, Major Eliraz Peretz of Eli, and Staff Sergeant Ilan Sviatkovsky of Rishon LeZion, were killed when a grenade on a soldier's vest was hit and exploded. Israeli soldiers returned fire and killed two militants. Another IDF unit also fired on a separate group of militants planting explosives along the border, wounding two. On March 27, Israeli troops backed by tanks, armored vehicles, helicopters, and mortars entered Gaza in retaliation and clashed with Palestinian fighters. According to Palestinian sources, five Israeli tanks and two armored bulldozers entered Gaza and fired shells at targets near Khan Younis before withdrawing. An Israeli spokesperson confirmed that Israeli bulldozers were used to flatten infrastructure used by terrorists. One Palestinian gunman was killed in an Israeli airstrike during the fighting. According to Palestinian medical sources, a Palestinian civilian was also killed and twelve more wounded.

== Aftermath ==
The Palestinian armed groups Hamas, Islamic Jihad Movement in Palestine, and Jaljalat, claimed to have been involved in the fighting. Israeli Prime Minister Benjamin Netanyahu expressed condolences to the families of the dead and the wounded, while a Hamas spokesperson claimed the deaths of the two soldiers as revenge for Mahmoud al-Mabhouh.

The IDF took note that both the soldiers killed during the hostilities died when a single hand grenade carried in one of the soldiers' vests was hit and exploded as a result. Israeli engineers subsequently developed an upgraded version of the M26 grenade, designed not to explode when struck by a bullet.

France expressed concern of the clashes and released a statement stating, "France firmly condemns the attacks which cost the life today of two Israeli soldiers at the frontier of the Gaza Strip." The Foreign Ministry also expressed regret for the continuous deaths in the Israeli–Palestinian conflict.
