= Talibani =

"Talibani", derived as an adjective from the Arabic, طالب ṭālib, "student", may refer to

- Something of, or relating to, the Taliban Islamic fundamentalist political movement in Afghanistan
- Something of, or relating to, a student
- Jalal Talabani (1933–2017), Iraqi Kurdish politician who served as the sixth President of Iraq from 2005 to 2014

== See also ==
- Taliban (disambiguation)
