= Doghmush clan =

Palestinian family in Gaza

- Territory: Gaza Strip
- Ethnicity: Palestinians
- Activities: extortion, arms trafficking, smuggling

The Doghmush family (Arabic: دغمش, romanized: Duġmuš) is a Palestinian clan from the Gaza Strip known for its long-running rivalry with Hamas. Nizar Doghmush is the de facto leader of the clan, while Mukhtar Doghmush was the leader of the clan’s northern branch. Mumtaz Doghmush was the historical leader of the clan.

== Spelling ==
The family originally came to Gaza from Turkey in the early 20th century and had relatives in Hatay Province; consequently, their name is also spelled Doğmuş, using current Turkish orthography. Doğmuş (Turkish pronunciation: [doːmuʃ]) means "born" using the inferential or dubitative past tense.

== Activities with Gaza's militant factions ==
Members of the clan are affiliated or aligned with various Palestinian and Islamist groups, including Fatah, Hamas, Popular Resistance Committees, and Al-Qaeda.

The family has reportedly been involved in extortion, smuggling, arms dealing and the killing of rivals. The clan has been dubbed "The Sopranos of Gaza City".

Mumtaz Doghmush, who was involved in the kidnapping of Gilad Shalit, led the Army of Islam by 2008. After Hamas' takeover of Gaza, the Doghmush clan was often involved in violent and deadly clashes with Hamas security forces. After the killing of a Hamas police officer, Hamas security forces raided a clan stronghold, leading to fighting between the clan and Hamas forces on 16 September 2008. Ten clan members, including Mumtaz's brother, were killed in the worst breakout of violence in Gaza since July 2008. Also killed was the infant daughter of Zakaria Doghmush, secretary general of the Hamas-affiliated Popular Resistance Committees.

== Johnston kidnapping ==
Clan members affiliated with Al-Qaeda were involved in the kidnapping and holding of the British journalist Alan Johnston from March to July 2007. The clan members proclaimed themselves as the Jaysh al-Islām (Army of Islam), and being behind the kidnapping and holding of the British journalist Alan Johnston for four months in 2007. They are linked to the British-based Palestinian-Jordanian extremist Abu Qatada. Mumtaz is suspected as the mastermind of Johnston's kidnapping.

== Gaza war ==
On 15 November 2023, 44 members of the clan were killed by an Israeli airstrike on a mosque in Sabra, Gaza. Between 17 November and 17 December, Israeli forces committed two massacres against the family, carrying out a saturation bombing of the block the family was concentrated in within the Sabra Neighbourhood. The attack caused the death of 109 members of the clan, including the leader. Al Jazeera Mubasher published a list of dead family members it received from the ministry of health.

On 22 November 2023, 3 members of the clan were killed by the IDF snipers in the "ghost unit." Israeli soldier Daniel Raab from Naperville, Illinois, allegedly confessed to killing 19 year old Salem Doghmosh in a video released by journalist and activist Younis Tirawis. An investigation by The Guardian newspaper confirmed the incident.

In March 2024, during the Gaza war, the leader of the Doghmush clan, Saleh Doghmush, was killed. Israeli news outlets reported that Hamas had clashed with the family during the war and executed Doghmush, although the family denied this.

== Alleged collaboration with Israel ==
Hamas has accused the Doghmush clan of collaborating and negotiating with Israel. In June 2025, Benjamin Netanyahu confirmed that Israel armed anti-Hamas clans and militias in Gaza, but the Doghmush clan was not specifically named.

After the October 2025 clashes, a senior source in Gaza's Ministry of Interior told Al Jazeera that the Doghmush militia had ties to Israel. However, some other reports from Gaza dispute this connection. Nizar Doghmush, head of the family in Gaza, acknowledged that Israel asked him to manage a "humanitarian zone," but he had refused.

== October 2025 conflict with Hamas ==
After the announcement of the 2025 October ceasefire, the clan killed two Hamas members in Gaza City, including the son of a military intelligence head. A day later, Hamas killed a clan member and arrested 30 others. A clan source accused Hamas of having started the conflict by evicting family members from a building where they had taken refuge. During the clashes, the Doghmush clan was also responsible for the killing of journalist Saleh al-Jafarawi.

== See also ==
- Hilles clan
- Salafi jihadist militant groups in the Gaza Strip
