= Mujahideen Shura Council in the Environs of Jerusalem =

Armed Palestinian Salafi jihadist group

- Black Standard of ISIL
- Leader: Abū al-Muḥtasib al-Maqdisī ('Abd Allah al-'Ashqar)
- Dates active: 2012–2013
- Active regions: Gaza Strip, Egypt
- Part of: Islamic State of Iraq and the Levant (since 2014)
- Wars: Gaza–Israel conflict Salafi-jihadist insurgency in the Gaza Strip; Sinai Insurgency

The Mujahideen Shura Council in the Environs of Jerusalem (Arabic: مجلس شورى المجاهدين في أكناف بيت المقدس) or simply the Mujahideen Shura Council (also known as the Mujahideen Shura Council of Jerusalem, Arabic: مجلس شورى المجاهدين, romanized: Majlis Shura Al-Mujahideen, Magles Shoura al-Mujahedeen, and other names) was an armed Palestinian Salafi jihadist group linked to al-Qaeda and later the Islamic State, that is active in Egypt's Sinai Peninsula and in the Gaza Strip. The group was formed in 2011 or 2012 by Salafist Islamist Hisham Al-Saedni (also known as Abu al Walid al Maqdisi) to coordinate the activities of the Salafi jihadist groups operating in Gaza even before the Egyptian Revolution of 2011 and has carried out attacks against civilians in Israel. The group describes violence against Jews as a religious obligation that brings its perpetrators closer to God. Al-Saedni, who was the leader of the group and also of Jahafil Al-Tawhid Wal-Jihad fi Filastin, was killed in an Israeli airstrike in Gaza on 14 October 2012. The group is subordinated with Al-Qaeda in Sinai Peninsula as of August 2012.

In February 2014, the group declared its support for the Islamic State of Iraq and the Levant. The group was designated a terrorist organization by the US State Department on 19 August 2014, until the revocation of the designation in March 2022. In its explanation for the designation the State Department noted that:

the Mujahidin Shura Council in the Environs of Jerusalem is an umbrella group composed of several jihadist terrorist sub-groups based in Gaza that has claimed responsibility for numerous attacks on Israel since the group's founding in 2012. For example, on August 13, 2013, MSC claimed responsibility for a rocket attack targeting the southern city of Eilat, Israel. Previously, MSC claimed responsibility for the March 21, 2013 attack in which Gaza-based militants fired at least five rockets at Sderot, Israel, and the April 17, 2013 attack in which two rockets were fired at Eilat, Israel. In addition to the rocket launches, MSC declared itself responsible for a Gaza-Israel cross-border IED attack on June 18, 2012 that targeted an Israeli construction site, killing one civilian. In addition to these physical attacks, the MSC released a statement in February 2014 declaring support for the Islamic State of Iraq and the Levant.

One of these sub-groups is Jahafil Al-Tawhid Wal-Jihad fi Filastin (or al-Tawhid wal-Jihad, "Unity and Jihad") which had been formed on 6 November 2008 and is also linked to Al Qaeda. In 2011 the group was also led by Hisham Al-Saedni. Another sub-group is Ansar al Sunnah, which has taken responsibility for several rocket attacks against Israel, including a rocket attack in March 2010 that killed a Thai worker in Israel. Following the March 2010 attack, Haaretz reported that the group was "apparently linked to Jund Ansar Allah," another jihadist group operating in Gaza.

== Attacks ==
=== 18 March 2010 ===
Militants linked to the group launched a rocket in Israel, killing a worker from Thailand. The group later claimed responsibility for the attack.

=== 18 June 2012 ===
The group claimed responsibility for a cross border attack in Israel on 18 June 2012, when attackers detonated an improvised explosive device near the Egyptian-Israeli border and opened fire on vehicles carrying construction workers. Israeli civilian Saeed Fashafshe, a 35-year-old Arab resident of Haifa and a married father of four, was killed, as were at least two of the terrorists.

In a video, the group said the attack was dedicated to Osama bin Laden and Syrian jihadists. It further stated that it is waging jihad "to become a building block in the global project aiming for the return of the rightly-guided Caliphate and the institution of the pure Shariah". It identified the leaders of the attack as Egyptian citizen Khalid Salah Abdul Hadi Jadullah (also known as Abu Salah al Masri) and Saudi citizen Adi Saleh Abdullah al Fudhayli al Hadhli (also known as Abu Hudhayfa al Hudhali).

In a later video statement released in July, the group characterized the attack as "a gift to our brothers in Qaedat al-Jihad and Sheikh Zawahiri" and retaliation for the death of Osama bin Laden.

=== 26 August 2012 ===
The group launched three rockets at the Israeli city of Sderot on 26 August 2012. One of the rockets damaged a building in an industrial area near the city. One person was lightly wounded and a second was treated for acute stress reaction.

In an internet statement, the group took credit for the attack and asked God to "assist us against the unbelieving people". It emphasized the following points in explaining the rationale for the attack:

- Jihad for the sake of Allah against the criminal Jews is an obligation that we draw closer to Allah whenever we find a way to that, in any place, by what Allah facilitates to us from the reasons of power and repelling.
- It is a right for the mujahidin of the Ummah to support and aid them, and it is unacceptable that any party targets them by harassing or persecution or arrest, as long as they have only left to do an obligation required from every Muslim in a time when many are reluctant from going to jihad.
- All those sincere in the organizations should shake off the dust of humiliation, sitting back and reckon to the mortal ruins of this Dunya, and rise up to support their religion and defend their sanctities, and they should remember that they have only joined their organizations for the jihad for the sake of Allah.
- Let the Jews know that the holy sites, sanctities and blood have men who don't sleep over oppression, and aren't pleased by humiliation, and spend their blood and what they own cheaply for that, and what is coming is worst and more bitter by the willing of Allah the Irresistible Avenger.

=== Response by the Israel Defense Forces ===
On 7 October 2012, the Israel Defense Forces (IDF) and the Israel Security Agency carried out an air strike in the southern Gaza Strip targeting Tala'at Halil Muhammad Jarbi, who the IDF said was involved in the planning and execution of the June 18 attack and other terrorist activities in the Gaza Strip. Also targeted in the air strike was Abdullah Muhammad Hassan Maqawai, who was said to be a member of the group.

On 14 October 2012, al-Saedni was killed while on a motorcycle in an Israeli airstrike. Israel said it was responding to a rocket attack on southern Israel earlier.

=== 21 March 2013 ===
Around 7:15 am on 21 March 2013, on the second day of a visit by US President Barack Obama to Israel, the group fired four rockets from Beit Hanoun at Sderot, triggering alarms in local communities and forcing residents on their way to work or school to run to bomb shelters. One rocket hit the backyard of a home in the city, spraying shrapnel into the walls and shattering windows. A second projectile landed in an open area within the surrounding Sha'ar Hanegev Regional Council. The two remaining rockets landed within the Gaza Strip. No injuries were reported.

The group claimed responsibility for the attack, stating that it was meant to show that Israeli air defenses could not stop attacks on the Jewish state.

=== Hamas crackdown ===
In July 2013, Hamas cracked down on PRC and MSC activities in Gaza, arresting a number of their members.

== Denial ==
The group denied involvement in the August 2012 Egypt-Israel border attack, in which 16 Egyptian soldiers were killed and an Israeli border post was stormed.

== See also ==
- Mujahideen Shura Council (Iraq)
- Mujahideen Shura Council (Afghanistan)
