= Killing of Rami Ayyad =

2007 killing of Palestinian Christian activist in Gaza City, Palestine

- Part of the Salafi-jihadist insurgency in the Gaza Strip
- Date: 7 October 2007
- Location: Gaza City, Gaza Strip, Palestine
- Type: Kidnapping, torture, murder, hate crime
- Cause: Salafi jihadism Anti-Christian sentiment
- Perpetrators: Jaish al-Mu'minun; Ashraf Abu Layla (Alleged)
- Deaths: 1

Rami Khader Ayyad was a Palestinian Christian activist kidnapped and killed by unknown assailants in Gaza City on 7 October 2007. He was the manager of the only Christian bookstore in the Gaza Strip called The Teacher's Bookshop as well as the director of the Protestant Holy Bible Society.

The Gazan Salafi-jihadist group Jaish al Mu’minun, also known as "Al-Qaeda in Palestine", claimed responsibility for the murder. it is widely believed that Ayyad was targeted because of his Christian faith and his work at the bookstore. The bookstore had been the target of several attacks in the past, including bombings and arson.

== Background ==
In 2007, Gaza was home to approximately 3,000 Christians. Historically, Gazan Muslims and Christians had maintained cordial relations.

Ayyad was the manager of The Teacher's Bookshop (Arabic: مكتبة المعلمين), established in 1998 by the Palestinian Bible Society, an arm of the Gaza Baptist Church. The bookstore was a place where people could buy Christian literature, Bibles, and other religious materials. Located in the centre of Gaza City, it was the territory's sole Christian goods store, and catered to the needs of the Gazan Christian minority. In addition to selling books, the store also ran educational services and an Internet café. Ayyad was a devout Christian and community leader who was widely known for his charitable activities.

The bookstore faced multiple threats and attacks prior to Ayyad's kidnapping and killing. It had been bombed on several occasions, and Ayyad was known to have received death threats over the years. 6 months before his killing, the bookstore had been firebombed.

On 3 February 2006, two small pipe bombs exploded and destroyed the bookshop's doors. Soon afterwards, employees received a threatening note demanding that the shop close permanently. In the aftermath of the attack, many Gazans held rallies and gathered to show support for the shop remaining open. The store reopened five weeks later; Palestinian authorities were unable to determine the perpetrators of the attack. On 15 April 2007, the store was bombed a second time. The bombing took place as part of a string of attacks that targeted internet cafés and music stores on the same day, suspected to have been carried out by an Islamist group called the Sword of Islam. Prior to the bombing, masked gunmen abducted and beat the shop's security guard, demanding the keys to the shop.

== Kidnapping and killing ==
On 6 October 2007, at around 4:30 p.m., as Ayyad was locking up the bookstore, he was forced into a car by a group of masked men and driven away. His wife Pauline was with him at the time of the kidnapping but was not harmed. Ayyad's mother reported that he called the family after he was seized, saying he would be with "the people" for another two hours and that he may not return for a long time.

The next day, Ayyad's body was found in a field near the Zeitoun neighborhood in Gaza. He had been severely beaten. A note was found near his body that accused him of being a "missionary" and warned others not to engage in similar activities. According to witnesses and security officials, Ayyad had been driven a few blocks away from the store by his abductors and subsequently beaten with clubs and rifle butts by three gunmen who accused him of trying to spread Christianity. According to medical authorities, he had been both stabbed and shot.

== Aftermath ==
Following the killing, Ayyad's bookshop closed, and his widow and her children relocated to the West Bank. The Gazan Christian community had a subdued Christmas. Churches held simple services and Christmas decorations were not displayed. The lack of progress in finding Ayyad's killers led the community to fear Islamic extremists being emboldened, despite reassurances from Hamas. Many Christians left Gaza due to the religious tensions, in addition to economic sanctions imposed by Israel after the Hamas takeover.

=== Reactions ===
Ayyad's killing was condemned by Christian leaders, human rights organizations, and political leaders.

Hamas deputy Ismail Haniyeh expressed his disapproval of the killing and affirmed that the Islamist movement “would not allow anyone to sabotage” relationships between Muslims and Christians. Gaza's Interior Ministry released a statement affirming that the crime would not go unpunished and pledged to hold those responsible for Ayyad's murder accountable for their actions. Hamas maintained that the murder was not religiously motivated.

Director of the Palestinian Centre for Human Rights Raji Sourani condemned the killing, stating that the "ugly act" had no support from any religious group in Gaza. In 2008, Palestinian Authority President Mahmoud Abbas accused Ashraf Abu Layla, a then member of the Izz al-Din Al Qassam brigades, to be one of the killers. In 2017, Ashraf Layla, by then a former member of Hamas who had since been expelled, and allegedly joined a radical Salafist group, was accused of assisting in the assassination of a senior Hamas official, and of being recruited by the Israeli intelligence service by the Hamas. He was later convicted and executed after a military tribunal.

== See also ==
- Islamist anti-Hamas groups in the Gaza Strip
- Gaza Baptist Church
- Islamization of Gaza
- Persecution of Christians
- Crime in Palestine
