= Pakistani Taliban (disambiguation) =

The Pakistani Taliban or Tehrik-i-Taliban Pakistan (TTP) is an umbrella organization of various Islamist armed militant groups in Pakistan operating separately from the Afghan Taliban along the Afghan–Pakistani border.

Pakistani Taliban may also refer to:

- Pakistani members of the Taliban
- Jamaat-ul-Ahrar, a group that split and rejoined the TTP
- Tehreek-e-Nafaz-e-Shariat-e-Mohammadi

== See also ==
- Taliban (disambiguation)
