= Jaljalat =

Islamist group in Gaza

Jaljalat (Arabic: جلجلات, lit. ''thunder'') is an armed Sunni Islamist group operating in the Gaza Strip taking inspiration from al-Qaeda. In September 2009, the organization revealed it had attempted to assassinate former US president Jimmy Carter and Quartet Middle East envoy Tony Blair.

== Background ==
Mahmoud Taleb, also known by the kunya Abu Mutasem al-Maqdisi, is the leader of Jaljalat. A former commander of the Izz ad-Din al-Qassam Brigades, Hamas' armed wing, Taleb left Hamas and formed Jaljalat in opposition to Hamas' decision to participate in the 2006 Palestinian legislative elections. Taleb is seeking to establish an Islamic "emirate" in the Gaza Strip and has been described as "the Palestinian Osama bin Laden." The organization has an estimated 750 members, including dozens of former Hamas militiamen who oppose any sort of cease-fire deal with Israel and what they perceive as Hamas' move to religious "moderation."

Taleb has openly declared his organization's al-Qaeda inspiration: "We don't belong to al-Qaida organizationally, but we follow their ideology. We pray to Allah that we will become part of them. They are our brothers and it's our duty to support them." He further added that Jaljalat loyalists consider Osama bin Laden to be the "emir" and "guardian" of all Muslims.

== Relations with Hamas ==
The organization has been one of the Islamist anti-Hamas groups operating in the Gaza Strip. In an interview with the Palestinian newspaper Al-Ayyam, Talib condemned Hamas, claiming it exploits Salafist groups such as his to fight Israel: "The Hamas movement has tried to gather the Salafist youth and channel their thinking towards fighting the (Israeli) occupation whenever they want and however they want in an unannounced way."

Hamas officials have accused Jaljalat of perpetrating two bombing attacks outside government-controlled security institutions in Gaza City on 29 August 2009. The attacks, Hamas said, were carried out to avenge a recent crackdown on Jund Ansar Allah, another armed group operating in Gaza.

In October 2009, Hamas sources said they had captured Mahmoud Taleb after a year-long search and would "put him on trial for violating national security". "We will strike the Salafists with an iron fist and without mercy," a Hamas security commander said.

== Assassination plot ==
On 6 September 2009, the group revealed that it had attempted to assassinate former US president Jimmy Carter and Quartet Middle East envoy Tony Blair, calling the two "infidels" whose hands "are stained with Palestinian blood." The group also announced that it was planning to launch attacks on fellow militant Islamist group Hamas. Taleb disclosed that Hamas had foiled the plot and arrested those who attempted to carry it out. In response, Taleb has threatened that his members were preparing to launch attacks against Hamas.

== Possible infiltration into Egypt ==
In late 2009, Jaljalat announced that "until now al-Qaeda has not recognised us but we seek to carry out operations that would bring us closer to al-Qaeda and its leadership and to eventually gain accreditation from them", according to Palestinian political analyst Samir Ghattas. The analyst said that Jaljalat and other groups in the Gaza Strip may be seeking to gain the support from al-Qaeda by carrying out violent operations in Egypt. According to other analysts, Egyptian fear of such infiltration by militants lies behind Egypt's construction of its subterranean barrier along the Gaza Strip border.
