= Vittorio Arrigoni =

Italian journalist and peace activist (1975–2011)

- Born: 4 February 1975; Besana in Brianza, Italy
- Died: 15 April 2011 (aged 36); Gaza Strip, Palestine
- Cause of death: Murdered by Jahafil Al-Tawhid Wal-Jihad fi Filastin
- Occupations: Activist; journalist; blogger
- Movement: International Solidarity Movement

Vittorio Arrigoni (Italian: [vitˈtɔːrjo arriˈɡoːni]; 4 February 1975 – 15 April 2011) was an Italian journalist and activist. He worked with the Palestinian-led International Solidarity Movement (ISM), through which he arrived in the Gaza Strip in 2008. He maintained a website called Guerrilla Radio and also published a book about his experiences in Gaza City during the 2008–2009 Gaza War between Hamas and Israel.

In 2011, he was abducted and murdered by a group of Salafi jihadists. The Hamas government, which identified the perpetrators as Palestinian and Jordanian affiliates of al-Qaeda, subsequently initiated a manhunt and arrested the accused suspects during a raid on the Nuseirat refugee camp. Arrigoni was the first foreign national to have been involved in such an incident in the Gaza Strip since the kidnapping of British journalist Alan Johnston in 2007.

== Early and personal life ==
Arrigoni was born in the town of Besana in Brianza, near Monza, on 4 February 1975. He grew up in the small village of Bulciago, near Lake Como, where his mother, Egidia Beretta, served as mayor.

Once he passed his high school exams in Italy, he left his hometown and began working as a volunteer around the world (Eastern Europe, South America, Africa and the Middle East). In 2002, he visited Jerusalem which, according to his mother, was the "moment he understood his work would be concentrated there." He claimed that it was in his blood to fight for freedom as his grandfathers fought against the former fascist regime in Italy. He had the Arabic word for 'resistance' (مقاومة, muqāwama) tattooed on his right arm.

== Political activism ==
External image
- "Vittorio Arrigoni...a pro-Palestinian activist from Italy, received a passport from Ismail Haniyeh, head of Hamas's government in Gaza, in 2008."—The New York Times

Arrigoni was credited as one of the many activists who revived the International Solidarity Movement (ISM), a pro-Palestinian group that works in the Palestinian territories. In August 2008, he participated in the Free Gaza mission that aimed to break the Israeli blockade of the Gaza Strip, in place since June 2007 when Hamas took power in the territory. He was on the first boat that arrived in the Port of Gaza, describing that moment as "one of the happiest and most emotional of his lifetime."

While volunteering to act as a human shield for a Palestinian fisherman off Gaza's coast in September 2008, Arrigoni was injured by flying glass after the Israeli Navy used a water cannon to deter the vessel. In November, he was arrested by Israeli authorities after again acting as a human shield for fishermen off Gaza's coast.

He returned to Gaza prior to the Israeli military offensive Operation Cast Lead, which lasted from December 2008 to January 2009. Arrigoni was one of the few foreign journalists in Gaza during the war; he worked with Radio Popolare and as reporter for the Italian newspaper Il manifesto. He later published a book, Restiamo umani (en: Gaza, Stay Human), a collection of his reportage from Gaza. It is translated into English, Spanish, German, and French with a preface by Israeli historian Ilan Pappé.

== Political views ==
"Zionism is an abominable, racist and colonial movement. Like all colonial and apartheid systems, it's in the interest of all that it be swept away. My hope is to see it replaced, without any bloodshed, with a democratic, secular and lay state – for example on the borders of historic Palestine – and where Palestinians and Israelis could live under equal rights of citizenship without ethnic and religious discrimination. It's a wish that I hope will soon become a reality."

— Vittorio Arrigoni, 2010

Arrigoni was described as having a "fervent commitment to the Palestinian cause." Arrigoni described four Palestinians who died in a tunnel under the Gaza-Egypt border as "martyrs". One of his last posts on Guerrilla Radio, which he wrote hours before he was kidnapped and killed, praised Palestinian efforts to smuggle goods into Gaza via tunnels as an "invisible battle for survival."

In an interview with the newspaper PeaceReporter, he said: "Personally, as an activist for human rights, I don't like Hamas at all. I have something to say to them too: they have deeply limited human rights since they have won the elections."

In his website, Guerrilla Radio, and Facebook page, Arrigoni described the government of Israel as one of the worst apartheid regimes in the world. He said the Israeli blockade on Gaza was criminal and villainous.

== Kidnapping and death ==
Kidnapping and murder of Vittorio Arrigoni
- Part of the Salafi jihadist insurgency in the Gaza Strip
- Date: 14–15 April 2011
- Location: Gaza Strip, Palestine
- Type: Kidnapping, murder
- Motive: Salafi jihadism Anti-Christian sentiment
- Perpetrator: Tawhid wal-Jihad
- Outcome: Hamas crackdown on Tawhid wal-Jihad

Arrigoni was kidnapped on 14 April 2011. In a video posted on YouTube in which they identified themselves as belonging to a previously unknown group, "The Brigade of the Gallant Companion of the Prophet Mohammed bin Muslima," Arrigoni was blindfolded with blood seen around his right eye. The captors demanded the release of their leader Hisham Al-Saedni (aka Abu al-Walid al-Maqdisi), the head of the so-called Jahafil at-Tawhid wa al-Jihad fi Falastin, the local al-Qaeda branch in Gaza, who was imprisoned by the de facto government in Gaza on 2 March 2011, as a ransom and threatened Arrigoni's killing if a 30-hour deadline was not met. The captors accused Arrigoni of "spreading corruption" and his home country Italy as an "infidel state."

=== Murder ===
For uncertain reasons, before the deadline expired, the captors killed Arrigoni in an empty apartment in the Mareh Amer area in northern Gaza. A witness at the scene of his murder reported that he was likely either hanged or strangled. After being led to the house by a member of the suspected Salafi group, Hamas security forces stormed the building and found Arrigoni's body.

An autopsy revealed that Arrigoni had been strangled with a plastic cord, but journalists were not allowed to see the body and no independent confirmation of the cause of death was possible. Tawhid al-Jihad denied responsibility for the killing, but stated it was "a natural outcome of the policy of the government carried out against the Salafi." Iyad ash Shami, a leader of another Salafi group based in Gaza, denied involvement of Salafi militants and said the killing went against Islam. Security forces in Gaza arrested four suspects in connection to the incident, and Gaza Prime Minister Ismail Haniyeh ordered an investigation by the Interior Ministry, and called Arrigoni's mother to send his condolences.

== Manhunt and trial ==
Hamas police initiated a manhunt for people involved in the murder. Hamas authorities sealed off parts of the Gaza Strip before the beginning of the operation, during which gunfire and at least one explosion were heard.

Hamas security forces laid siege to a house where the suspects were staying, in the Nuseirat refugee camp, in central Gaza. The suspects refused to surrender and a gun battle ensued. Hamas policemen entered the home and killed Balal al-Omari and a Jordanian, Abbad a-Rahman al-Brizat (one of the two dead men may have committed suicide). A third suspect, Mahmoud al-Salfiti, was wounded and detained. Three of the suspects' associates were also captured. Hamas Interior Ministry spokesman Ihab al-Ghussein reported that five Hamas policemen were injured, as well as a girl who was caught in the crossfire.

The four extremists captured in the raid were charged over Arrigoni's abduction and murder in a Hamas military court. The trial was presided over by military judge Abu Omar Atallah. They were found guilty in September 2012. Mahmoud al-Salfiti, 28, and Tamer al-Hasana, 27, were sentenced to life imprisonment with hard labor: the court refrained from imposing the death penalty on them after Arrigoni's parents urged that they be spared. Khader Jram, 24, was sentenced to 10 years imprisonment and Amer Abu Ghouleh, 23, was given a prison term of one year for sheltering fugitives. Following an appeal, a military court reduced the sentences of Salfiti and al-Hasana from life to 15 years on 19 February 2013. "We asked in our appeal for the conviction for murder and abduction to be dropped to only abduction," their lawyer Mohammed Zaqut said.

In June 2015, after being granted a furlough from prison, Mahmoud al-Salfiti managed to escape from Gaza to Iraq, where he joined ISIS. On 28 November 2015 he was reportedly killed fighting for ISIS in Anbar province.

== Reactions to death ==
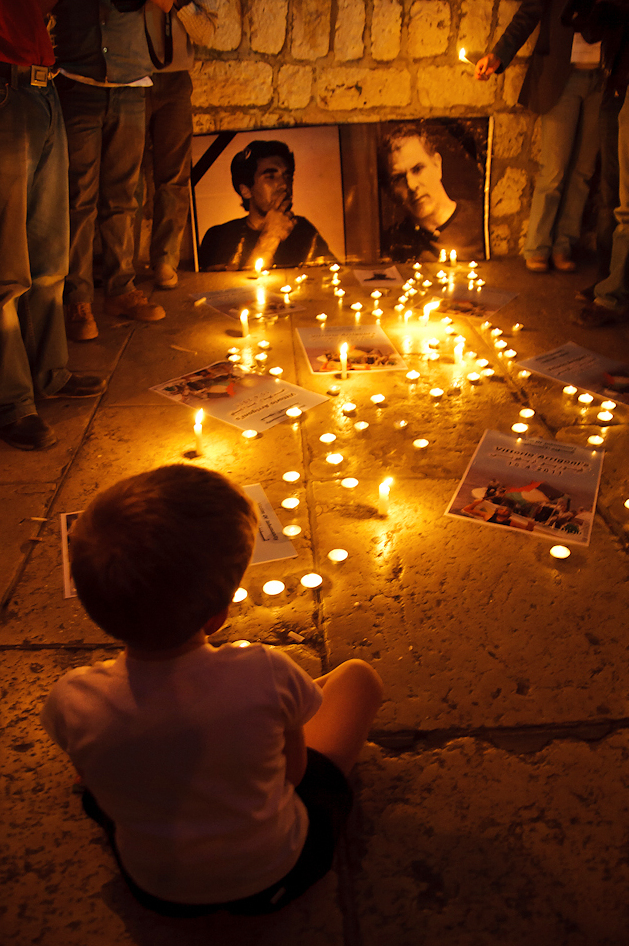
Candlelight vigil held at the Church of the Nativity in Bethlehem for Vik Arrigoni (left) and the director of The Freedom Theatre in Jenin, Juliano Mer-Khamis

Several hundred Gazans rallied in the Unknown Soldier's Square to mourn Arrigoni while about 100 Palestinians and internationals marched through Ramallah to a house of mourning in nearby al-Bireh in the West Bank. In Bethlehem, a candlelight vigil was held outside the Church of the Nativity. Egyptian authorities offered to allow Arrigoni's family to enter Gaza through the Rafah crossing and his body to be sent back to Italy via the crossing.

=== Palestinian response ===
An official statement from Hamas described the killing as a "disgraceful act" by a "mentally deviated and outlawed group." Gaza Prime Minister Ismail Haniyeh stated the killing "does not reflect the values, morals, or the religion of the Palestinian people. This is an unprecedented case that won't be repeated." He also said Arrigoni would be designated a martyr and a street would be named after him. The Hamas Foreign Minister said that he would get a state funeral, after which the body would be transferred to Egypt. Hamas spokesman Fawzi Barhoum condemned the killing as 'shameful'.

Various condemnations of Arrigoni's killing were released by other Palestinian factions with Fatah decrying it as an "act of betrayal," the Popular Resistance Committees calling it "cowardly," Islamic Jihad calling it a "grotesque crime," and Mustafa Barghouti saying it was a "shocking criminal act." A spokesman for Palestinian president Mahmoud Abbas condemned it as an "act of treason".

=== International response ===
The foreign ministry of Italy expressed "deep horror over the barbaric murder," calling it an "act of vile and senseless violence committed by extremists who are indifferent to the value of human life." UN Secretary-General Ban Ki-moon pressed the Gaza government to bring to justice "the perpetrators of this appalling crime."

=== Accusations against Israel ===
Although Arrigoni was killed by suspected members of the Palestinian Salafist group Jahafil Al-Tawhid Wal-Jihad fi Filastin, some blamed Israel for the murder. In spite of the fact that Hamas identified the perpetrators with a Palestinian group affiliated with al-Qaeda, Hamas spokesman Fawzi Barhoum said he suspected Israel might be responsible since the death appeared to be timed to deter foreign activists from joining a flotilla due to sail to Gaza in May to break Israel's naval blockade of the area.

Mahmoud al-Zahar, a member of the Hamas leadership, indirectly accused Israel of engineering the killing of Arrigoni in an attempt to scare off international activists from coming to Gaza. He said that "such an awful crime cannot take place without arrangements between all the parties concerned to keep the blockade imposed on Gaza". Al-Zahar offered no evidence to support his accusation.

== Analyses of Arrigoni ==
According to The Guardian's correspondent in Italy, Arrigoni was "first and foremost a pacifist." Khaleel Shaheen of the Palestinian Centre for Human Rights in Gaza, a friend of Arrigoni, described him as a "hero of Palestine". Max Ajl, another friend of Arrigoni and a fellow ISM activist, eulogized Arrigoni as "a courageous and dedicated opponent of the Israeli occupation and advocate of resistance to oppression in the Middle East and around the world."

A Jerusalem Post article published shortly after Arrigoni's death cited criticism of Arrigoni by Steven Plaut, associate professor of business administration at the University of Haifa, by Fiamma Nirenstein, a Jewish member of the Italian Chamber of Deputies who was deputy chair of its Foreign Affairs Committee and chair of its Committee for Investigating Antisemitism, and by Noah Pollak, executive director of the Emergency Committee for Israel, accusing Arrigoni of being a supporter of violence instead of a peace activist.

== See also ==
- List of peace activists
- List of journalists killed during the Israeli-Palestinian conflict
- Kidnapping of Alan Johnston (release secured by Hamas, 2007)
- Iain Hook - British UNRWA worker fatally wounded by IDF sniper in the West Bank, 22 November 2002.
