= Mumtaz Dughmush =

Palestinian Islamist

Mumtaz Dugmush
- ممتاز دغمش
- Born: Gaza Strip, Palestine
- Occupation: Army Leader
- Organization: Army of Islam (Gaza)
- Known for: Terrorism

Mumtaz Dughmush (ممتاز دغمش, also spelled Mumtaz Dogmosh) alias Abu Muhammad is the leader of the Palestinian militant group Jaish al-Islam and the head of the Dughmush clan in Gaza City. He was formerly a member of the Hamas party.

In 1990, Mumtaz Dughmush was a member of the Palestine PSO led by Mohammed Dahlan.

Following the 2006 Palestinian legislative elections in 2006, Dughmush, whose militia was now functioning independently, allied with the PRC and Hamas’s Qassam Brigades to seize Israeli soldier Gilad Shalit. However, he went against the Islamic factions' control by abducting two journalists from Fox News and was later reported to have proposed the assistance of several hundred fighters to Fatah.
