= Army of Islam (Gaza) =

Islamic militant organization in Palestine

Army of Islam جَيش الإسلام Jaysh al-Islām
- Logo of the Army of Islam
- Leader: Mumtaz Dughmush
- Dates active: 2005–present
- Allegiance: Islamic State (Wilayat Sinai); Popular Forces
- Active regions: Gaza Strip; Egypt; Syria
- Ideology: Salafi jihadism Sunni Islamism
- Wars: Salafi-jihadist insurgency in the Gaza Strip

Army of Islam (Arabic: جَيش الإسلام Jaysh al-Islām), officially The Army of Islam Group in Jerusalem (Jama'at Jaysh al-Islam fi Bayt al-Maqdis), is a Salafi Jihadist militant organization in the Gaza Strip. It was founded by the Doghmush clan in 2006, and is based in the Tzabra neighborhood in the center of the Gaza Strip. The group has been designated a terrorist organization by the United States and the UAE.

== History ==
The Army of Islam was founded in late 2005. The Army of Islam split from Hamas due to the members agreeing with Al-Qaeda's ideology which goes against Hamas'. The Army of Islam never fully gained the support of Al-Qaeda nor did it get any praise during its early years in activities, though the Army of Islam became allies with Tawhid al-Jihad and, later, Ansar Bait al-Maqdis which led to the organization pledging bay'ah to the Islamic State and its leader at the time, Abu Bakr al-Baghdadi.

An Israeli helicopter strike killed Army of Islam senior leader Mohammed Jamil al-Nemnem, 27, in Gaza City on 3 November 2010. Nemnem was second-in-command to Mumtaz Doghmush. Egypt had reportedly tipped-off Israel that Nemnem was helping plan an attack on the Multinational Force and Observers in the Sinai Peninsula. In a subsequent statement, Israel claimed Nemnem was involved in directing multiple terrorist attacks targeting Israelis in recent years.

Following the Nemnem strike, the Israeli Air Force killed group members Mohammed and Islam Yassif in a drone strike on 17 November 2010. The strike was coordinated with Israeli Shin Bet and occurred around dawn on a busy street in Gaza City, and cited the same security issues as that in the killing of Namnam.

In 2015, the group had reportedly pledged allegiance to the Islamic State and joined as a part of the Islamic State – Sinai Province.

By 2018, the group faced increasing repression by Hamas which was unwilling to tolerate its extremist activities. In turn, the group considers Hamas an apostate organization, and has called upon Muslims to carry out lone wolf attacks against Israel.

In 2025, it was revealed that Ghassan al-Dahini, a commander in the Israeli-backed and anti-Hamas Popular Forces, was formerly an official in the Army of Islam.

== Ideology ==
According to the U.S. government, the group is Salafist and combines a global jihad ideology with Palestinian armed resistance. As of 2011, the group was attempting to deepen its contact with al-Qaida. After the death of Osama bin Laden, Army of Islam's Al Nur Media Foundation released a eulogy.

The group appears to draw inspiration from, or is linked to, al-Qaeda, and has conducted at least one bombing of a Palestinian civilian target (an empty school) and a number of other kidnappings. The group was originally closely related to Hamas, but its extremist stances eventually alienated both Hamas and Fatah. The group has also been known as The Organization of jihad in Palestine and is linked to Abu Qatada, the British-based Palestinian-Jordanian extremist Sheikh who they demanded be released in exchange for Johnston.

== Activities ==
The group has been responsible for a number of attacks in Israel and Egypt and Western citizens, including the kidnappings of Israeli soldier Gilad Shalit and two Fox News journalists in 2006 and British journalist Alan Johnston in 2007.

In 2011, the group told the French security services that they had planned an attack on the Bataclan theatre because its owners were Jewish.

A limited number of fighters belonging to the group travelled to Syria from 2012 to fight in the Syrian Civil War; several of these volunteers were killed in combat. In 2016, the Army of Islam released a eulogy for the Islamic State's commander Abu Omar al-Shishani after he was killed in fighting in al-Shirqat, Iraq. Nevertheless, the group has not openly admitted any links to ISIL.

=== Kidnapping of Alan Johnston ===
In March 2007 the group kidnapped BBC correspondent Alan Johnston. On 25 June 2007 the group released a video showing Johnston with an explosive belt around his waist, with a demand for the release of Muslim prisoners in British custody. The group also kidnapped ten members of Hamas and claimed they would kill Johnston if there was an attempt to rescue him. On 4 July 2007, after Gaza authorities arrested several members of the group including spokesman Abu Muthana, and following threats of execution, Johnston was handed over to Hamas officials and released after 114 days in captivity.

=== Alexandria bombing ===
The group has been linked with the 2011 bombing of a Coptic church in Alexandria that resulted in 23 deaths. Egypt's Interior Minister said on 23 January that evidence proved that the group planned and executed the attack. The group quickly denied responsibility, while also reportedly expressing support for the bombing.

== See also ==
- Islamist anti-Hamas groups in the Gaza Strip
- Jund Ansar Allah
- Jahafil Al-Tawhid Wal-Jihad fi Filastin
- Army of the Islamic State
