= Steve Centanni =

American journalist

- Born: Steven James Centanni
- Occupation: News reporter
- Known for: Being kidnapped and held hostage

Steven James "Steve" Centanni is an American former news reporter for Fox News Channel.

== Journalism career ==
Centanni joined FNC in 1996.

During Operation Iraqi Freedom, he served as an embedded journalist with the Navy SEALs and provided numerous first reports for the network, including a report that the U.S. had captured two main offshore oil terminals located 22 miles (35 km) off Iraq's southern coast, preventing them from being blown up by Iraqi forces.

Previous to Fox, Centanni had worked for KRON-TV in San Francisco, California.

Centanni retired in August 2014.

== Education ==
Centanni attended the University of Colorado at Boulder and earned a Bachelor's degree in broadcasting from San Francisco State University.

== Gaza kidnapping ==
On August 14, 2006, he was kidnapped by Palestinian gunmen while on assignment in Gaza City, along with Olaf Wiig, a cameraman from New Zealand, with a group calling itself the Holy Jihad Brigades claiming responsibility. On August 27, the Palestinian news service Ramattan and FOX News reported that Centanni and Wiig were released unharmed.
