= Hisham Al-Saedni =

Palestinian militant leader (1965–2012)

Hisham Al Saedni هشام السعيدني
- Born: 1965; Gaza
- Died: 13 October 2012 (aged 47); Jabalia

Hisham Al Saedni (Arabic: هشام السعيدني), also known by the nom de guerre Abu Walid al-Maqdisi, was a Palestinian military activist and a Muslim leader and founding member of the Mujahideen Shura Council in the Environs of Jerusalem in the Gaza Strip and he was also leader of al-Tawhid wa al-Jihad, a branch of al-Qaeda in Gaza.

== Early life ==
Al-Saedni was born around 1965 in Cairo, and according to other sources in Bureij in Gaza Strip and his family moved to Egypt when he was two years old. He lived in Egypt and Jordan. He fought for Al Qaeda in Iraq. Egypt wanted to arrest him due to his alleged involvement in attacks against Egypt's tourist sites.

== Militant activities ==
On 5 February 2011, Al-Saedni, then also known as Sheikh 'Ahed Ahmad 'Abd Al-Karim Al-Sa'idani, was the leader of a Gazan jihadist group calling itself Jama'at al-Tawhid wal-Jihad, and posted a fatwa stating that Jews and Christians may be targeted in lethal attacks such as those of 9/11 because they are "aggressive combatants" and "fundamentally not innocent". The fatwa also stated that it is not permissible to refrain from such attacks for fear of hurting Muslims, "because this would mean stopping the jihad".

Al-Saedni tried to unite all the different groups of Salafi jihadists in Gaza to form and lead the Mujahideen Shura Council in the Environs of Jerusalem.

On 2 March 2011, Hamas authorities in Gaza arrested Al-Saedni for his involvement with the earlier jihad operations of al-Tawhid wal-Jihad allegedly related to the Salafist jihadist movement. During his detention, in April 2011, Al-Saedni's supporters from al-Tawhid wal-Jihad kidnapped the Italian pro-Palestinian activist Vittorio Arrigoni and later killed him. He was released in August 2012, but was killed in an Israeli airstrike two months later.

== Death ==
Hisham Al-Saedni was killed on 13 October 2012 by an Israeli Air Force strike together with Ashraf Al-Sabah who was also a Salafist. The attack occurred on a busy street in the Jabalia district of Gaza City. Israel said it was responding to an earlier rocket attack on southern Israel.
