= 2006 Fox journalists kidnapping =

Kidnapping of two journalists in the Gaza Strip

- Part of the Salafi jihadist insurgency in the Gaza Strip
- Screenshot of Steve Centanni (left) and Olaf Wiig (right) in an interview with Greta Van Susteren
- Date: 14–27 August 2006
- Location: Gaza Strip, Palestine
- Type: Kidnapping, forced conversion
- Motive: Attempt at hostage diplomacy and coercive negotiation
- Perpetrator: Jaysh al-Islam
- Outcome: Centanni and Wiig released unharmed

Fox News Channel journalists Olaf Wiig (born 1970), a New Zealand photojournalist, and Steve Centanni, an American reporter, were kidnapped in the Gaza Strip from their TV van near the Palestinian security services' headquarters on August 14, 2006. The abductors were initially thought to be from a previously unknown Palestinian militant group called the "Holy Jihad Brigades"; it was later revealed that Jaysh al-Islam ("The Army of Islam"), a Salafi-jihadist group, carried out the kidnapping.

No militant group initially claimed responsibility and no demands were made. Only on August 24, ten days after the kidnapping, was a video released of the men. The abductors demanded that all Muslim prisoners in the United States be released within 72 hours. No indication was given as to what would happen after this time if the demand was not met.

The two were released on August 27, 2006, after a video was released with the two men stating they have converted to Islam. The two men later said they were forced to convert to Islam at gunpoint.

== Kidnapping ==
A witness saw two vehicles blocking the journalists' transmission truck and a masked man put a gun to their bodyguard's head, forcing him to the ground.

== Efforts to free the men ==
=== Media organisations ===
In an internal message by Fox News Channel Senior Vice President John Moody confirmed the abduction and warned about reporting on the story. Fox sent executive Ken LaCorte to the region to press for their release. Jennifer Griffin, a Fox correspondent who was closely involved in negotiations to free the two, said "We met with warlords. We met with head of Hamas, Fatah, Al Aqsa Brigade, popular resistance committees. Islamic Jihad offered to help us." At one point, Griffin and others were taken to a tense meeting with top members of various Palestinian groups. Although a ransom of $2 million was eventually paid, Fox has denied being behind this.

Al-Jazeera called for the "immediate release" of the journalists and "in adherence to its code of ethics, reiterates its rejection of attacks of any kind on journalists from any organisation. Al Jazeera calls for the immediate release of the two kidnapped colleagues."

Journalist Fares Akram, who worked in the same building Wiig did, said he thought Palestinian officials had information on Wiig's captors and their location. Hole said he had "seen those reports too, but nothing's come through to us that changes the current situation."

=== New Zealand ===
New Zealand Prime Minister Helen Clark expressed concern for Wiig's safety and said "The Ministry of Foreign Affairs was alerted by British authorities this morning. New Zealand diplomats are traveling to the region to work with other officials and governments on the release of Mr Wiig and his colleague."

Jan Henderson, NZ Ambassador to Turkey and Israel, arrived in Gaza on August 15. She met with Palestinian President Mahmoud Abbas and other Palestinian leaders who were "very upset" about the kidnapping. Henderson said, "They assured me they are doing all they can, they take this matter extremely seriously, and we are looking for a very quick and peaceful resolution to this particular kidnapping. The Palestinian Authority has offered every cooperation. They are very upset. They have condemned the kidnapping, and they assured me they are doing everything they can for a quick and speedy resolution." After meeting with Abbas, Prime Minister Clark said, "On hearing of the kidnapping he had instructed the security apparatus of the Palestinian Authority to work to locate the kidnappers and secure the release... President Abbas was very fulsome in what he said. His parting comment was 'these people are our guests and we will do whatever we can to help'."

Ministry of Foreign Affairs and Trade spokesman Rob Hole said there were no developments as of August 18, but said that NZ diplomats were "still active in talking but also active in waiting as well, so no breakthrough at all." Ambassador Henderson and the NZ consul to Egypt Brian Chambers have met with officials from the Palestinian, British, American and Australian foreign ministries. Senior diplomat Peter Rider is on his traveling to the Middle East and will replace Henderson, who is returning to New Zealand.

=== Hostages' families ===
During the ordeal, Wiig's then wife, Anita McNaught, told New Zealand radio from Gaza City that she had only heard "rumours, sons of rumours...none of which we give much credence to" and that kidnappings in the region were "local entrepreneurial banditry". McNaught had said that although it was unusual for so much time to pass without news, "every kidnapping is different. There is no handbook for how you do them." She expressed hope for a breakthrough in the case in the following days and met with several senior officials. McNaught had said that it was unlikely they would leave the area soon after Wiig was released.

On August 17 the United States State Department condemned the kidnappings and called for the journalists to be freed immediately. Clark phoned Wiig's family and offered her support and left a message with McNaught. Wiig's family had said they were "deeply grateful for the care that is being extended to us and for the prime minister's direct call to us."

=== Harmeet Sooden ===
Harmeet Singh Sooden, an Auckland University student who was held captive in Iraq for four months by the Swords of Righteousness Brigade, appealed to the kidnappers in a press statement on August 17, 2006:

During our captivity in Iraq, virtually all of Palestine called for our release. Today, I implore those holding Olaf Wiig and Steve Centanni to free them immediately and unharmed. It is essential that we, the public, understand the greater context within which the kidnapping has taken place. Thousands of Palestinians, including hundreds of women and children, have been kidnapped by Israeli forces as part of a campaign to murder a nation under the aegis of the United States. I also call upon the media to fulfil its obligations and report the reality of the Israel-Palestine conflict, and desist from counter-productive speculation and commoditizing private trauma. I wish the negotiating team, which includes New Zealand diplomats, success.

== Release ==
On August 27, the Palestinian news service Ramattan and Fox News reported that Centanni and fellow captive Wiig were released unharmed, shortly after a new video was released. In the video, both journalists, wearing beige robes, read statements saying that they had converted to Islam. After being freed, Centanni stated "We were forced to convert to Islam at gunpoint, and don't get me wrong here, I have the highest respect for Islam, and learned a lot of very good things about it, but it was something we felt we had to do, because they had the guns, and we didn't know what the hell was going on."

After their return to New York, Centanni and Wiig gave an interview with Greta Van Susteren on her Fox program On the Record. According to Wiig, the kidnappers were convinced that Centanni worked for the CIA, in part because of his presence as a journalist at the deaths of Uday and Qusay Hussein in Iraq, and that they intended to kill him. Nevertheless, they also repeatedly promised both men they would soon be freed.

Fox News denies paying any ransom.

== See also ==
- 2005–2006 Christian Peacemaker hostage crisis
- List of kidnappings
