= Ministry of Tourism and Antiquities (Palestine) =

Government ministry of Palestine

Agency overview
- Formed: 1994
- Jurisdiction: Government of Palestine
- Headquarters: Ramallah, Palestine
- Minister responsible: Hani al-Hayek, Minister of Tourism and Antiquities
- Website: www.mota.ps

The Ministry of Tourism and Antiquities is a governmental body responsible for the development and management of the tourism sector in Palestine, as well as the preservation and protection of the country's cultural heritage and antiquities. Hani al-Hayek is the current minister.

Established in 1994, the ministry's main goal is to promote Palestine as a unique and attractive tourism destination, with a focus on cultural and historical tourism. The ministry works towards achieving this goal by developing and implementing policies, strategies, and programs that support the growth of the tourism industry in Palestine, while also ensuring the preservation of the country's cultural heritage sites.

The ministry's main activities include the identification, protection, and restoration of historic sites and buildings, as well as the development of cultural and heritage tourism products and services. The ministry also provides support and guidance to local communities and businesses involved in the tourism industry.

Additionally, the ministry is responsible for regulating and licensing tour operators, travel agencies, and other tourism-related businesses in Palestine, as well as providing training and educational programs to enhance the skills and knowledge of the tourism workforce.

== List of ministers ==
#	Name	Party	Government	Term start	Term end	Notes
Minister of Tourism
1	Elias Freij	Independent	1, 2	5 July 1994	May 1997	
2	Mitri Abu Aita	Independent	3	9 August 1998	13 June 2002	
Minister of Tourism and Antiquities
3	Nabeel Kassis	Independent	4, 5	13 June 2002	30 April 2003	
(2)	Mitri Abu Aita	Independent	6	30 April 2003	7 October 2003	
4	Salam Fayyad	Independent	7	7 October 2003	12 November 2003	
(2)	Mitri Abu Aita	Independent	8	12 November 2003	24 February 2005	
5	Ziad al-Bandak	Independent	9	24 February 2005	29 March 2006	
6	Joudeh George Murqos	Independent	10	29 March 2006	17 March 2007	
7	Khouloud Daibes	Independent	11, 12, 13	17 March 2007	16 May 2012	
8	Rula Maayah	Fatah	14, 15, 16, 17, 18	16 May 2012	31 March 2024	
9	Hani al-Hayek	Fatah	19	31 March 2024	Incumbent	

== See also ==
- Tourism in Palestine
