= Ministry of Public Works and Housing (Palestine) =

Government ministry of Palestine

Agency overview
- Formed: 1994
- Jurisdiction: Government of Palestine
- Headquarters: Ramallah, Palestine
- Minister responsible: Ahed Bseiso, Minister of Public Works and Housing
- Website: www.mopwh.ps

The Ministry of Public Works and Housing is a government ministry in Palestine. The ministry is responsible for achieving sustainable urban development in the housing and infrastructure sector in Palestine, and it is also responsible for the rehabilitation and maintenance of existing infrastructure, whether left by the Israeli occupation destroyed over the years of its occupation or the destruction caused by repeated incursions and the construction of new ones.

== List of ministers ==
#	Name	Party	Government	Term start	Term end	Notes
Minister of Housing
1	Zakaria al-Agha	Fatah	1	5 July 1994	17 May 1996	
2	Abdul Rahman Hamad	Fatah	2, 3	17 May 1996	13 June 2002	
Minister of Public Works
1	Azzam al-Ahmad	Fatah	2, 3	17 May 1996	13 June 2002	
Minister of Public Works and Housing
1	Azzam al-Ahmad	Fatah	4, 5	13 June 2002	30 April 2003	
2	Hamdan Ashour	Fatah	6	30 April 2003	7 October 2003	
3	Abdul Rahman Hamad	Fatah	7, 8	7 October 2003	24 February 2005	
4	Mohammad Shtayyeh	Fatah	9	24 February 2005	29 March 2006	
5	Abd al-Rahman Zeidan	Hamas	10	29 March 2006	17 March 2007	
6	Samih al-Abd	Fatah	11	17 March 2007	14 June 2007	
7	Muhammad Kamal Hassouna	Independent	12	14 June 2007	19 May 2009	
(4)	Mohammad Shtayyeh	Fatah	13	19 May 2009	16 May 2012	
8	Maher Ghoneim	Fatah	14, 15, 16	16 May 2012	2 June 2014	
9	Mufid al-Hasayneh	Independent	17	2 June 2014	13 April 2019	
10	Muhammad Ziyara	Independent	18	13 April 2019	31 March 2024	
11	Ahed Bseiso	Independent	19	31 March 2024	Incumbent	

== See also ==
- Architecture of Palestine
