= Ministry of Awqaf and Religious Affairs (Palestine) =

Government ministry of the Palestinian Authority

Agency overview
- Formed: 1994
- Jurisdiction: Government of Palestine
- Headquarters: Ramallah, Palestine
- Minister responsible: Sharhabil al-Za'im, Minister of Awqaf and Religious Affairs
- Website: pal-wakf.ps

The Ministry of Awqaf and Religious Affairs is a government ministry in the Palestinian Authority. The Ministry of Awqaf and Religious Affairs is responsible for organizing and directing religious affairs in Palestine.

== Establishment ==
The Ministry of Endowments and Religious Affairs was established in 1994 during the beginning of the Palestinian National Authority, following the issuance of a presidential decree by President Yasser Arafat to establish it. Hasan Tahboub assumed the ministerial portfolio as the first minister of the ministry.

== Functions ==
The Palestinian Ministry of Endowments and Religious Affairs undertakes many tasks, the most important of which is to take care of religious affairs while maintaining the moderation of the curriculum, and to preserve, develop and develop the properties of the endowment.

== List of ministers ==
#	Name	Party	Government	Term start	Term end	Notes
1	Hasan Tahboub	Independent	1, 2	5 July 1994	27 April 1998	
	Vacant		2, 3	27 April 1998	13 June 2002	
2	Yasser Arafat	Fatah	4	13 June 2002	29 October 2002	Serving President
	Vacant		5, 6	29 October 2002	7 October 2003	
3	Ahmed Qurei	Fatah	7, 8	7 October 2003	24 February 2005	Serving Prime Minister
4	Yousef Juma Salameh	Independent	9	24 February 2005	29 March 2006	
5	Nayef Rajoub	Hamas	10	29 March 2006	17 March 2007	
6	Hussein Tartouri	Hamas	11	17 March 2007	14 June 2007	
7	Jamal Bawatneh	Independent	12	14 June 2007	19 May 2009	
8	Mahmoud al-Habbash	Fatah	13, 14, 15, 16	19 May 2009	2 June 2014	
9	Youssef Edais	Independent	17	2 June 2014	13 April 2019	
10	Mohammad Shtayyeh	Fatah	18	13 April 2019	1 January 2022	Serving Prime Minister
11	Hatem al-Bakri	Independent	18	1 January 2022	31 March 2024	
12	Muhammad Mustafa Najm	Independent	19	31 March 2024	15 October 2026	
13	Sharhabil al-Za'im	Independent	19	19 October 2026	Incumbent	

== See also ==
- Religion in Palestine
