= Ministry of Youth and Sports (Palestine) =

Government ministry of Palestine

- وزارة الشباب والرياضة

Agency overview
- Formed: 1974
- Jurisdiction: Government of Palestine
- Headquarters: Ramallah, Palestine
- Minister responsible: Minister of Youth and Sports

The Ministry of Youth and Sports is a government agency responsible for overseeing and promoting youth and sports activities in Palestine.

The Ministry of Youth and Sports aims to encourage and support the development of sports and physical activity in Palestine, as well as promote the importance of a healthy lifestyle. It also provides opportunities for young people to participate in social, cultural and educational programs.

== History ==
Ministry of Youth and Sports was established in 1974 and is part of the Palestinian National Authority. Its main headquarters was in Jordan, then it moved to the Palestine Liberation Organization. The Palestinian ministerial formation of January 7, 1994 was called the Ministry of Youth and Sports. A presidential decision dated April 16, 2011 changed the Ministry for Youth and Sports into the Higher Council of Youth & Sports of the present day.

== Responsibilities ==
The ministry is responsible for organizing national and international sports events, supporting sports clubs and associations, and providing funding for youth and sports projects.

=== Divisions of the Youth Council ===
- General Administration of Youth Affairs
- General Administration of Clubs
- General Administration of Sports Affairs
- General Administration of Scouts and Guides
- General management of projects and facilities
- Diaspora Council
- Public administration in the sub-councils of the northern and southern governorates

== Programs and initiatives ==
Some of the key programs and initiatives of the Ministry of Youth and Sports include the Palestinian Youth Parliament, which provides young people with a platform to engage in political and social issues, and the Palestine Olympic Committee, which is responsible for organizing and supporting Palestinian athletes in international competitions.

== List of ministers ==
#	Name	Party	Government	Term start	Term end	Notes
Minister of Youth and Sports
1	Azmi Al-Shuaibi	Palestinian Democratic Union	1	5 July 1994	17 May 1996	
2	Talal Sidr	Independent	2	17 May 1996	9 August 1998	
	Vacant		3	9 August 1998	13 June 2002	
3	Ali Al-Qawasmi	Fatah	4	13 June 2002	29 October 2002	
	Vacant		5	29 October 2002	30 April 2003	
Minister of State for Youth and Sports
—	Abdel Fattah Hamayel	Independent	6	30 April 2003	7 October 2003	
Minister of Youth and Sports
4	Jamal Al Shobaki	Fatah	7	7 October 2003	12 November 2003	
5	Salah Al-Tamari	Fatah	8	12 November 2003	24 February 2005	
6	Sakhr Bseiso	Fatah	9	24 February 2005	29 March 2006	
7	Ismail Haniyeh	Hamas	10	29 March 2006	17 March 2007	Serving Prime Minister
8	Basem Naim	Hamas	11	17 March 2007	14 June 2007	
9	Tahani Abu Daqqa	Independent	12	14 June 2007	19 May 2009	
	Vacant		13, 14, 15, 16, 17, 18, 19	19 May 2009	Present	
