= Meruane =

Meruane is a surname of Palestinian origin more commonly used in Chile. The name is a hispanicization of an original Arab language patronymic last name, Marwani (a nisba meaning “son or descendant of Marwan”).

However, while Marwani is the name of a prominent Levantine family numerous in Hebron, Palestine, and Jordan, with branches in Syria, Egypt and Lebanon, the connection with the Meruane family is not clear: the remaining part of the family in Beit Jala does not recognize this surname as their own. Another compelling theory about the surname is that those who moved to Chile lived in the Marauneh (or Marwaneh) neighborhood in Beit Jala, a Christian Orthodox town close to Bethlehem, Palestine. The entire Saba clan had their homes in this area [3] and the Chilean Meruane family does belong to the Saba clan in Beit Jala.

Most of the family migrated to Chile in the early 20th century, while Palestine was under the Ottoman Empire. There are two branches of the original family in Chile: they descend from brothers Farah and Teodoro. Natalio, Alberto, and Salvador Meruane Zagmutt, were sons of Farah, and were all merchants. Today Meruane is a large and well known family, with several branches, completely integrated to the Chilean society.

[3] Ghobar Vivian: "Clanes y barrios de Beit Jala", Revista Al Damir, Chile, 2018, pp 28–29.

== People with the name ==
- Nelly Meruane (1927–2018), Chilean actress and teacher (daughter of Alberto Meruane Zagmutt)
- Ricardo Meruane (born 1956), Chilean comedian (grandson of Alberto Meruane Zagmutt, son of Chucre Meruane Sanzur (Arabic: شكري مرواني, romanized: Shukrī Marwānī).
- Lina Meruane (born 1970), Chilean writer and professor (granddaughter of Salvador Meruane Zagmutt, daughter of cardiologist Jorge Meruane Sabaj).
