= First Arafat Government =

Palestinian government

- 1st Cabinet of Palestinian National Authority
- Date formed: 5 July 1994
- Date dissolved: 17 May 1996

People and organisations
- Head of government: Yasser Arafat
- Total no. of members: 20

History
- Successor: Second Arafat Government

The First Arafat Government was formed in 1994, when Yasser Arafat returned to Palestine, settling in Gaza City and promoted self-governance for the Palestinian territories. The government was dissolved following the 1996 Palestinian general election.

== Government Composition ==
Yasser Arafat's first government consisted of 20 ministries, 17 ministers (including one woman, Intissar al-Wazir). The positions of ministers of the Ministry of Public Works and the Ministry of Agriculture remained vacant, with a deputy minister appointed for each of them.

== Members of the Government ==
S.No	Portrait	Name	Portfolio	Party	Remarks
1		Dr. Yasser Arafat	President of the Palestinian National Authority and Minister of Interior	Fatah	Chairman of the Executive Committee of the Palestine Liberation Organization
2		Ahmed Qurei	Minister of Economy and Trade	Fatah	Member of the Executive Committee of the Palestine Liberation Organization
3		Nabil Shaath	Minister of Planning and International Cooperation	Fatah	
4		Saeb Erekat	Minister of Local Government	Fatah	
5		Riyad al-Za'noun	Minister of Health	Fatah	
6		Freih Abu Madin	Minister of Justice	Fatah	
7		Jamil al-Tarifi	Minister of Civil Affairs	Fatah	
8		Zakaria al-Agha	Minister of Housing	Fatah	
9		Intissar al-Wazir	Minister of Social Affairs	Fatah	
10		Yasser Abd Rabbo	Minister of Culture and Information	Palestinian Democratic Union	Member of the Executive Committee of the Palestine Liberation Organization
11		Azmi Shuaibi	Minister of Youth and Sports	Palestinian Democratic Union	
12		Samir Ghawshah	Minister of Labour	Palestinian Popular Struggle Front	Member of the Executive Committee of the Palestine Liberation Organization
13		Mohammad Zuhdi Nashashibi	Minister of Finance	Independent	Member of the Executive Committee of the Palestine Liberation Organization
14		Yasser Amr	Minister of Education	Independent	Member of the Executive Committee of the Palestine Liberation Organization
15		Abdul Aziz al-Hajj	Minister of Transport	Independent	
16		Abdul Hafeez al-Ashhab	Minister of Communications	Independent	
17		Elias Freij	Minister of Tourism	Independent	
18		Hasan Tahboub	Minister of Waqf and Religious Affairs	Independent	
19		Vacant	Minister of Public Works		
20		Vacant	Minister of Agriculture		
