= Tahboub Al-Marwani =

Palestinian noble family

Tahboub family Āl Tahboub al-Marwani آل طهبوب المرواني
- Parent family: Banu Marwan
- Country: Palestine, Jordan
- Current region: Levant
- Origin: Al-Andalus
- Founded: c. 12th century AD
- Founder: Khayr al-Din al-Marwani al-Umawi
- Seat: Hebron
- Connected families: Al-Zaro Al-Marwani

Tahboub Al-Marwani (Arabic: آل طهبوب المرواني), also known simply as Tahboub or Al-Marwani, is a prominent Palestinian family of notables in the city of Hebron, Palestine and Jordan. The family claims Umayyad and Qurayshite descent through the Bani Marwan.

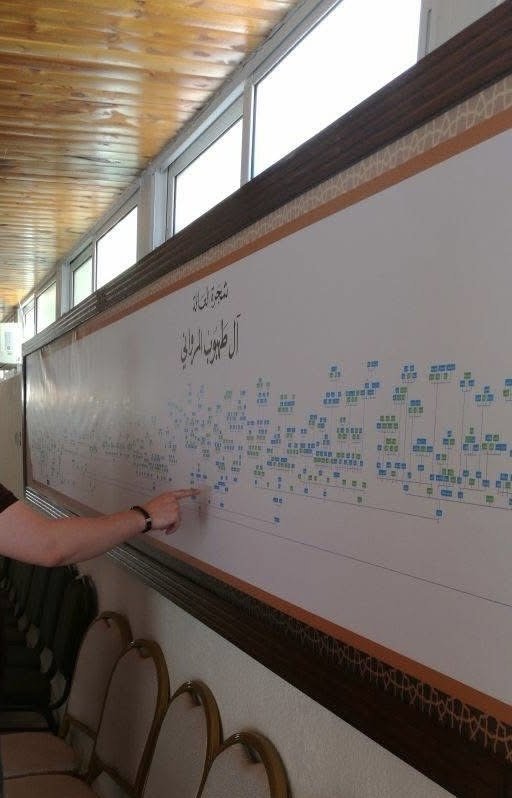
Family Tree of the Tahboub al-Marwani clan displayed at a family majlis. The tree is titled (center in bold) Shajarat al-ʿĀmmah Āl Ṭahbūb al-Marwānī (Arabic: شجرة العامة آل طهبوب المرواني, lit. 'The Tahboub al-Marwani General Family Tree')

== Tahboub Al-Marwani in Hebron ==
Tahboub Al-Marwani (Arabic: آل طهبوب المرواني), also known simply as Tahboub or Al-Marwani, is a prominent Palestinian family of notables in the city of Hebron, Palestine and Jordan. The family claims Umayyad and Qurayshite descent through the Andalusian branch of the Marwanids.

=== History and Origins ===
The Tahboub family is mentioned to be descendants of the Umayyads from the Marwanids, and are considered cousins of the Al-Zaro Al-Marwani family. Their lineage and origins are in the city of Hebron, but their roots trace back to al-Andalus.

The Tahboub family is descended from Khayr al-Din al-Marwani which returned from Andalusia to Palestine and settled in Hebron with his brother Shihab al-Din al-Marwani. Another brother, Muhammad, died at sea while returning from Andalusia. Their cousin, Shams al-Din Abu al-Barakat al-Marwani, the ancestor of the Al-Zaro Al-Marwani family, also migrated with them to the Levant establishing himself in Hebron as well.

According to family and Ottoman Ashraf syndicate records from Palestine , the Tahboub al-Marwani and Al-Zaro Al-Marwani families are descendants of Abd al-Rahman I al-Marwani al-Umawi, Emir of Córdoba, and both are considered the same family since they are cousins.

=== Endowments ===
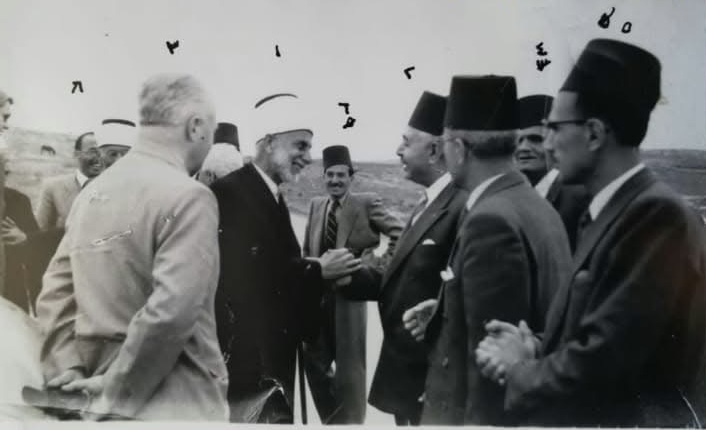
Sheikh Yousef Tahboub al-Marwani leading the receiver delegation on the occasion of the visit of Ali Tawfiq Shousha Pasha, member of the International Mediation Commission, to Hebron, Palestine

In Palestine, the Marwani line is chiefly represented by the Āl al-Ṭahbūb al-Marwānī and Āl al-Zarū al-Marwānī families of Hebron and related families in Jerusalem. Their endowment deeds and oral genealogies connect them to the early Umayyads, and several members served as merchants, jurists, governors and religious officials under Ottoman and Hashemite rule. A small number of families bearing the surname al-Marwani and al-Omawi appear in Jerusalem and Bethlehem awqāf records from the late nineteenth century.

=== Waqf Āl al-Ṭahbūb al-Marwānī in Hebron ===
Ottoman, late-Mandate, and early Jordanian sijillāt (Sharīʿa-court and awqāf registers) in Hebron, Palestine record a private and hereditary endowment known as the waqf Āl al-Ṭahbūb al-Marwānī, associated with the Ibrahimi Mosque ( al-Ḥaram al-Ibrāhīmī). These records list (1) the ‘‘mutawallī’’ or ‘‘nāẓir’’ (administrator) of the endowment, (2) mosque staff such as the ‘‘khaṭīb’’ and ‘‘imām’’, and (3) properties and revenue sources in the old quarters of Hebron. These entries indicate that members of the al-Ṭahbūb (Tahboub) al-Marwānī family exercised custodianship and administrative oversight of religious endowments tied to the mosque during the 19th and 20th centuries.

The al-Ṭahbūb (Tahboub) family identified in local genealogies as descendants of Banu Umayya through the Marwanid line, were among Hebron's notable families traditionally engaged in mosque and waqf administration. The family maintained an enduring religious and civic role comparable to the Āl al-Marwānī of Damascus, reflecting the Ottoman pattern of hereditary custodianship in major endowment institutions.

One of the most prominent modern members of the family was Hassan Tahboub (1918–1998), who served as Head of the Islamic Waqf and Holy Places Administration in Jerusalem under the Jordanian and later Palestinian authorities. Born in Hebron, he represented the continuation of the family's hereditary waqf service and was responsible for supervising Muslim holy sites including the Ibrahimi Mosque and the al-Aqsa Mosque. Contemporary sources note both his Qurayshite-Umayyad lineage and the family's enduring connection to religious institutions in Palestine.

The Ibrahimi Mosque's endowment was among the largest in southern Palestine, with properties and incomes spanning multiple urban quarters. The pattern of nepotistic yet stable staffing allowed prominent Qurayshite and scholarly families, particularly those of Umayyad, Hashemite, Umarid or Bakrid descent, to maintain religious, educational, and custodial positions within its governance structure. The recurring appearance of the al-Ṭahbūb al-Marwānī family in waqf registers illustrates this wider phenomenon of hereditary stewardship within Ottoman and post-Ottoman Palestinian society.

In Jordan, al-Marwani family branches settled in Amman, Karak, Irbid, Zarqa, and Salt following migrations from Hebron and Damascus during the late nineteenth and mid-twentieth centuries. They are registered in Jordanian civil and tribal genealogical directories as Qurayshite lineages of Syrian and Palestinian origin.

=== Ottoman-era ===
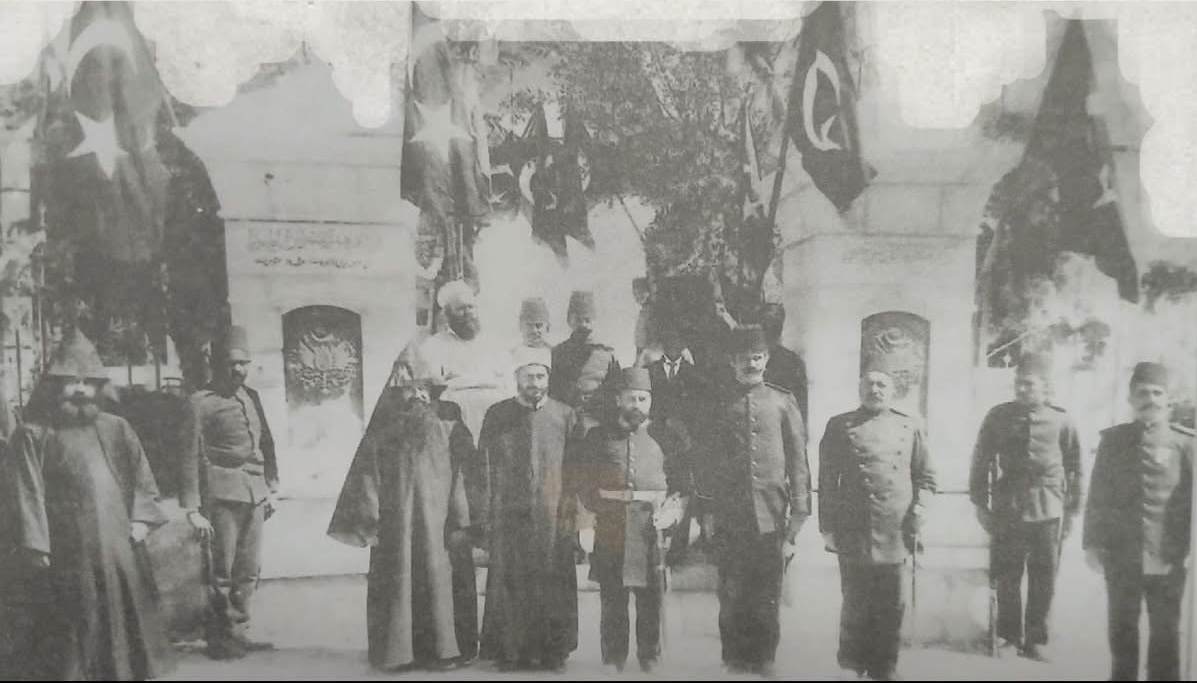
Sheikh Yousef Tahboub al-Marwani, Qadi of Bethlehem accompanied by Faidi al-Alami, the Ottoman mayor of Bethlehem and Jerusalem, Ottoman officers and Christian clergymen in Bethlehem, Palestine 1903

During the Ottoman period, the Tahboub al-Marwani family of Hebron is attested in Palestine, where the family administered endowments at the Ibrahimi Mosque and maintained Quranic schools during the late nineteenth century.

=== Modern and contemporary scholars ===
In the twentieth century, several Palestinian and Jordanian members of the family continued this tradition of religious service.The family played a notable role in Palestine and Jordan during the Mandate period. Prominent figures such as Sheikh Yousef Tahboub al-Marwani, the Qadi of Hebron, and Sheikh Abdullah Tahboub al-Marwani, the Mufti of Hebron, were active in religious leadership and also participated actively in the Palestinian national movement under the leadership of Amin al-Husseini.

== Notable members ==
Notable people with the surname include:

- Dima Tahboub (born 1976), Jordanian writer and politician
- Fayeq Hamdi Tahboub, Palestinian scouting leader
- Hasan Tahboub (1923–1998), Palestinian imam and politician
- Rami Tahboub, Palestinian diplomat and ambassador of the State of Palestine to Lebanon and Kuwait
- Abd al-Qadir Effendi Tahboub, one of the notables of the city of Hebron appointed by the Ottomans as a member of the Ashraf syndicate of Diyarbakir in 1913
- Abdel Rahman Tahboub (born in 1965), Palestinian-Jordanian journalist and writer

== Gallery ==
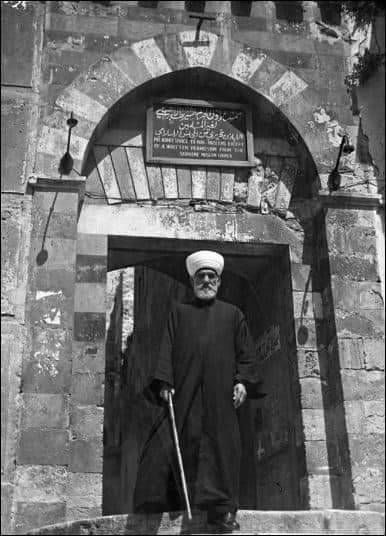
Sheikh Abdullah Tahboub al-Marwani, Mufti of Hebron, Palestine

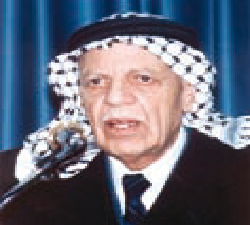
Sheikh Hassan Tahboub al-Marwani, Palestinian imam, leader of the Arabs in Jerusalem, head of the Supreme Muslim Council there, and the first Minister of Waqf and Religious Affairs

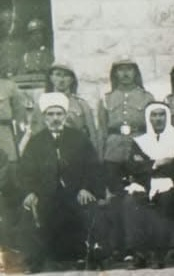
Sheikh Arif Hikmat Tahboub al-Marwani, Mufti of Karak, Jordan

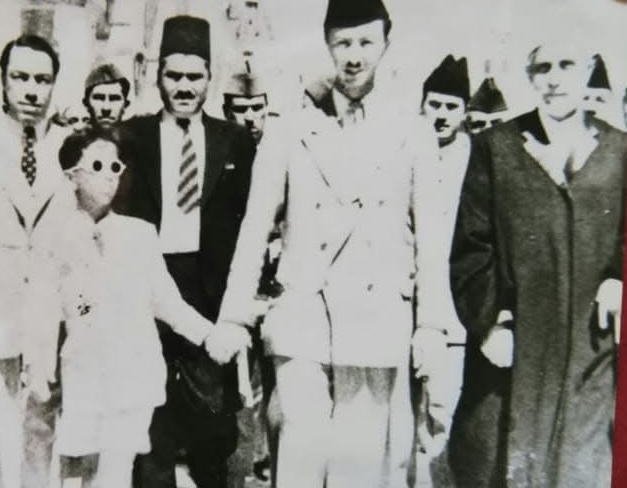
Picture of Crown Prince Abd al-Ilah of Iraq and the future Faisal II of Iraq, on a visit to the Noble Sanctuary, Al-Aqsa. Next to the Crown Prince, on his left, is Sheikh Yousef Tahboub al-Marwani, a member of the Supreme Muslim Council of Palestine

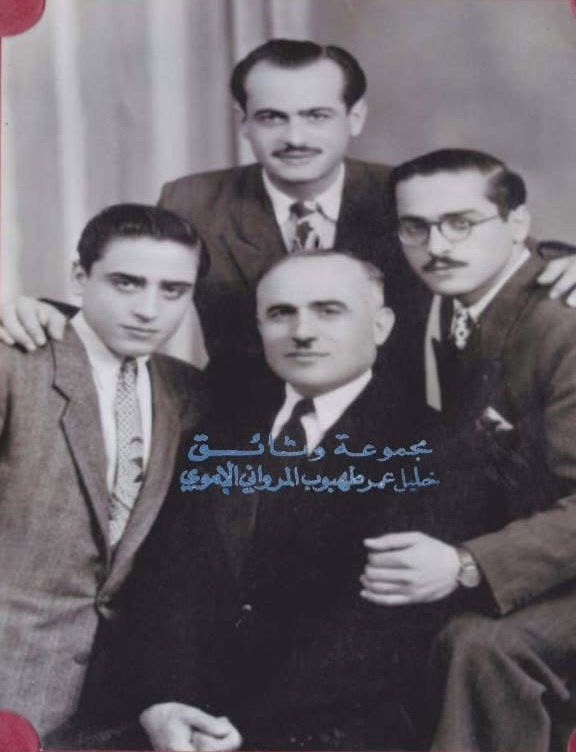
Sheikh Kamal al-Din bin Sheikh Ali Tahboub al-Marwani (b. 1898 CE), the Sheikh of Sheikhs of the Ibrahimi Mosque in Hebron, sitting in the middle among his sons: The upper one is Jamil, to his left is Khalil, and to his right is Adib Pasha

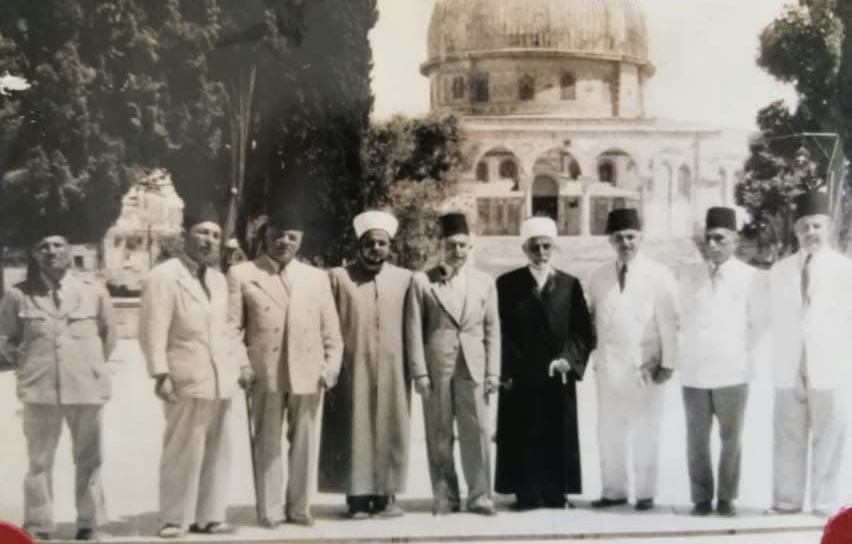
Delegation from the Arab Union hosted in Al-Aqsa by Sheikh Yousef T. al-Marwani (pictured in the center), member of the Supreme Muslim Council of Palestine (Jerusalem, March 12 1945)

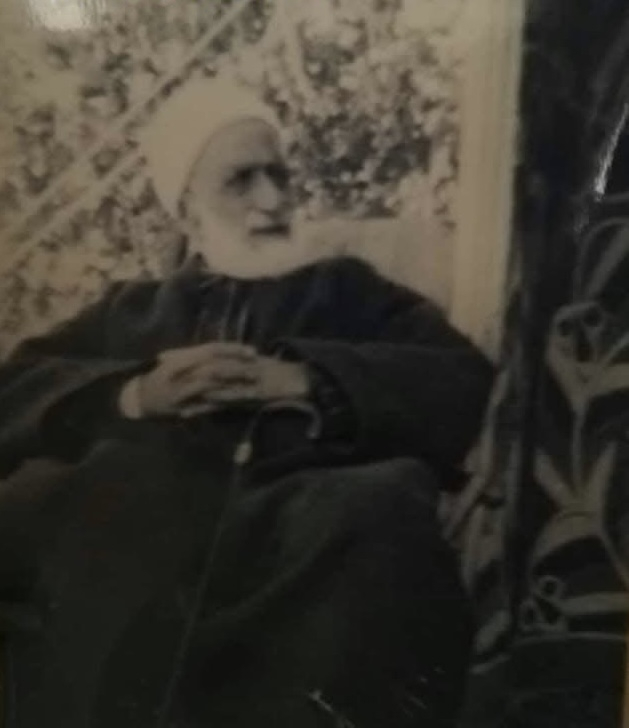
Sheikh Salim Effendi Tahboub al-Marwani, head of the Waqf department in Jerusalem and representative of Hebron in the General Council of Jerusalem

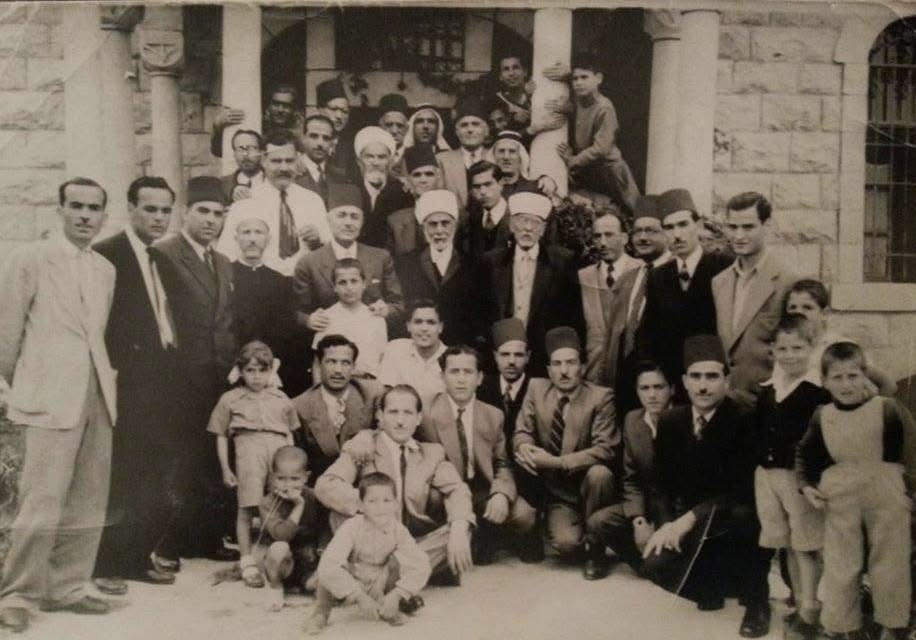
Members of the Tahboub al-Marwani family from Hebron: This photo was taken when the Egyptian Minister Ali Shousha Pasha was hosted at the home of Sheikh Yousef Tahboub al-Marwani, Qadi of Hebron and Member of the Supreme Muslim Council (Ain Khair al-Din, Hebron)

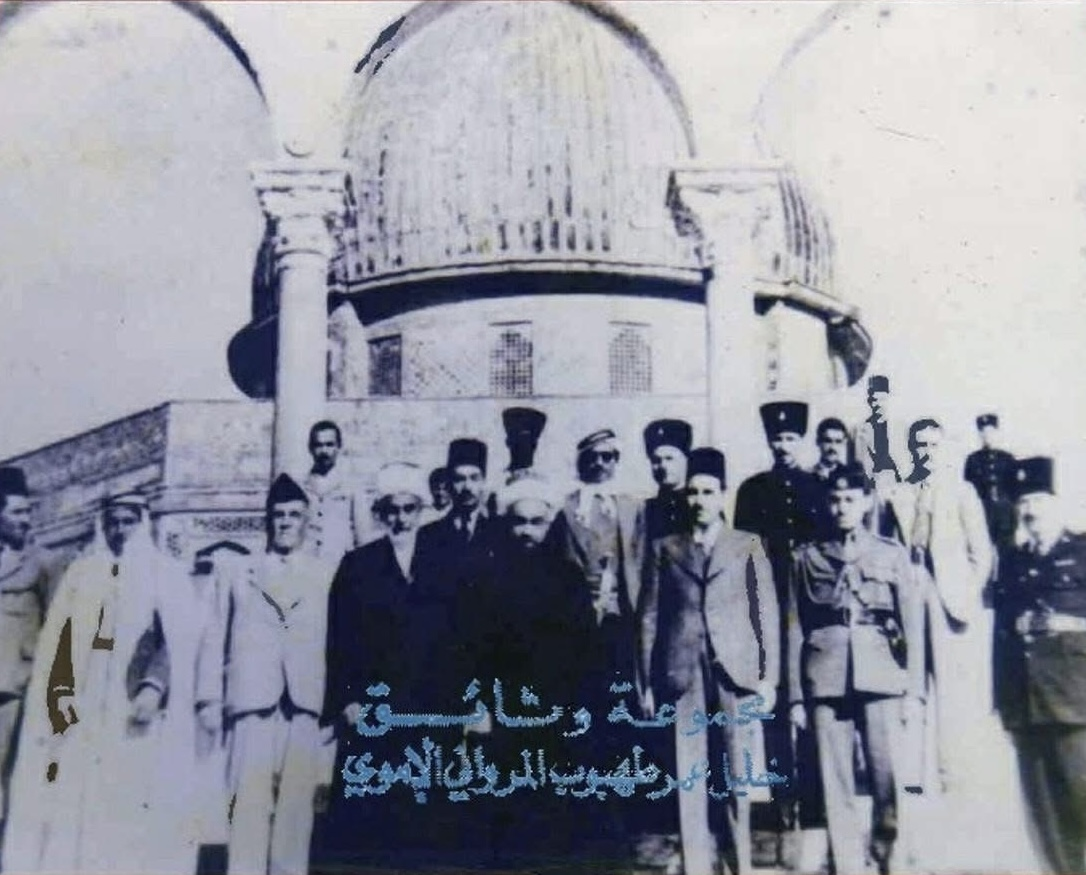
This picture refers to the visit of King Abdullah I, King of the Hashemite Kingdom of Jordan, to Al-Aqsa Mosque and the Dome of the Rock in Jerusalem in 1947 CE. He was received by everyone who came down the steps of the scales to visit the blessed Al-Aqsa Mosque. In the middle of the picture is His Majesty King Abdullah I, and to his right is Sheikh Yousef Tahboub al-Marwani, senior member of the Supreme Muslim Council in Palestine, receiving the King

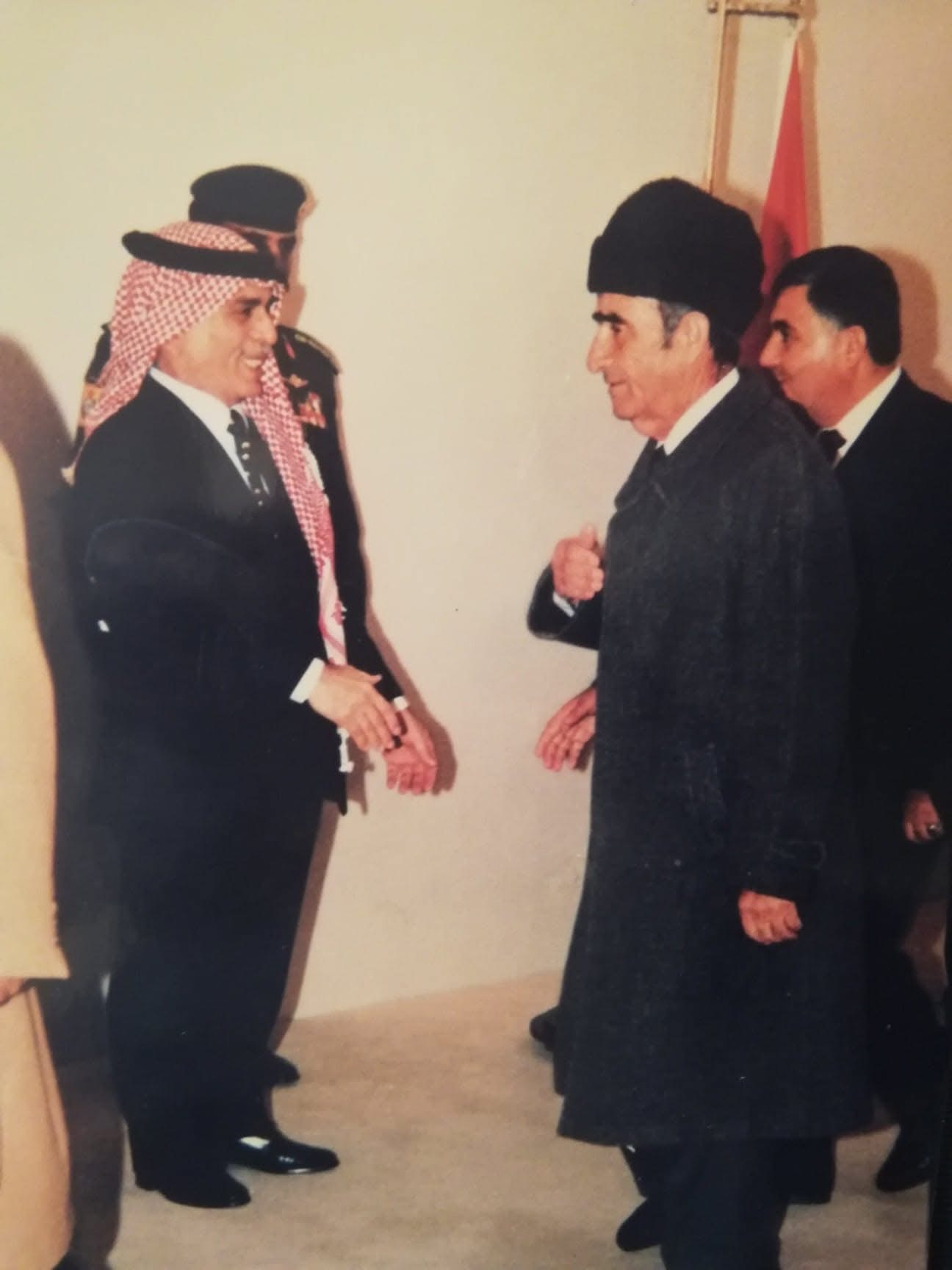
King Hussein of Jordan and Hajj Khalil Omar Tahboub Al-Marwani: During the holy month of Ramadan, it was customary for King Hussein to invite Jordan's notables and dignitaries to an iftar banquet and receive the invitees himself. One of those notables was Hajj Khalil Omar Tahboub Al-Marwani from Irbid

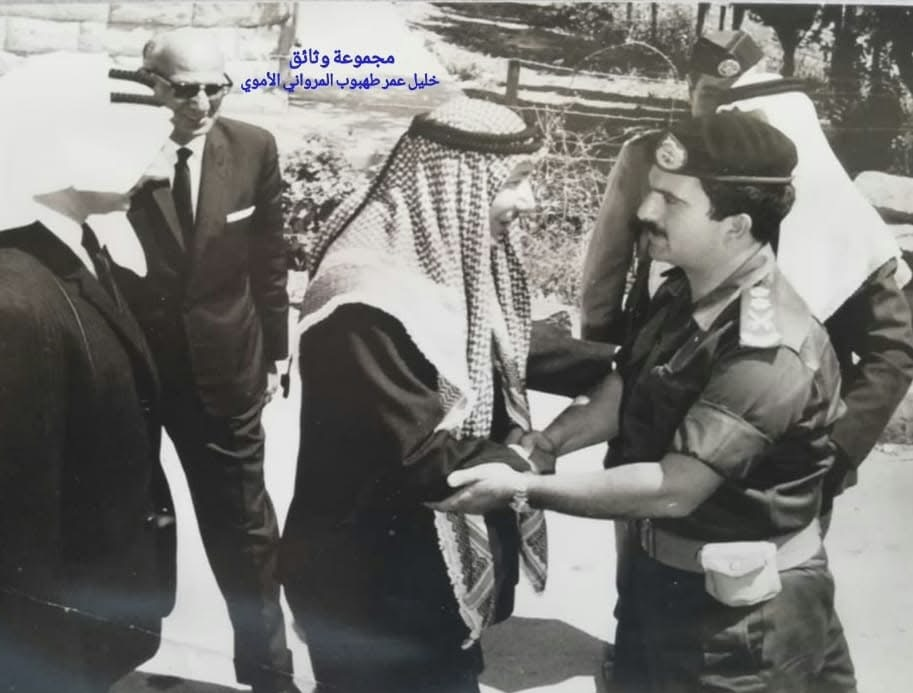
Prince Hassan bin Talal, the Crown Prince of Jordan, on an official visit to the Karak Governorate. He was received by Saadi bin Sheikh Abdullah Tahboub al-Marwani, the governor of the Karak Governorate

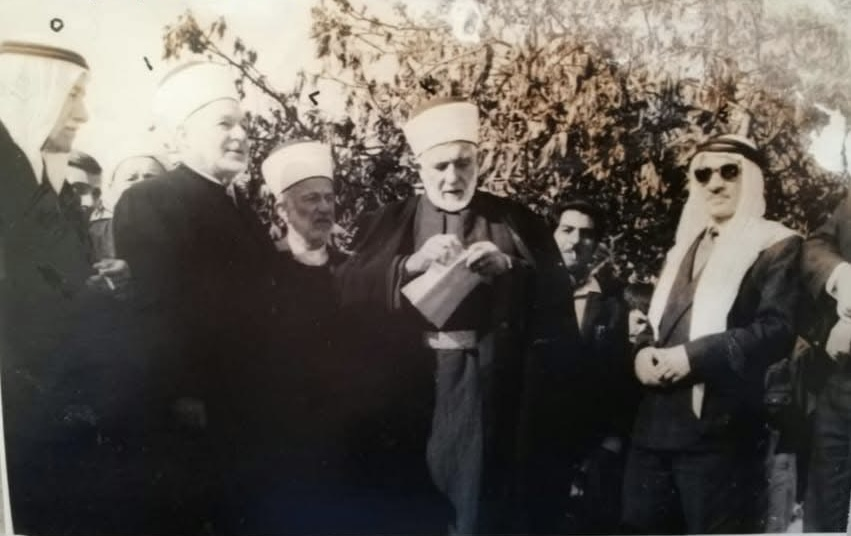
Sheikh Muhammad Ali al-Ja’abari, mayor of the city of Hebron, and to his left is Sheikh Mustafa bin Abdul Halim Tahboub al-Marwani, the Qadi of Hebron. Next to him is Sheikh Abdul Hayy Arfa, the Mufti of Hebron. Next to him is Ahmed al-Shuwaiki al-Rifai, in the city of Hebron. To the right of Sheikh Muhammad Ali is Hamdi Sultan al-Tamimi, one of the notables of Hebron

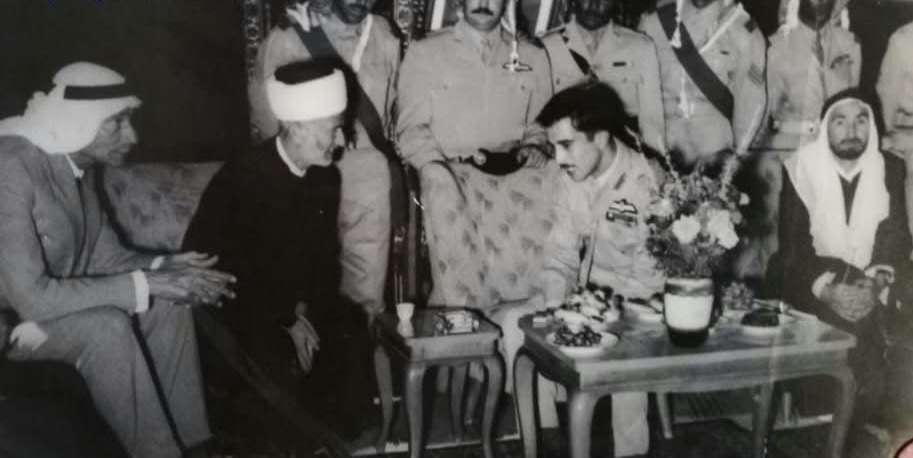
His Highness Prince Muhammad bin Talal of Jordan and Sheikh Mustafa bin Abdul Halim Tahboub al-Marwani, the then Qadi of Amman, sitting in front of him. Sheikh Mustafa Tahboub al-Marwani performed the wedding ceremony of the prince with Princess Firyal

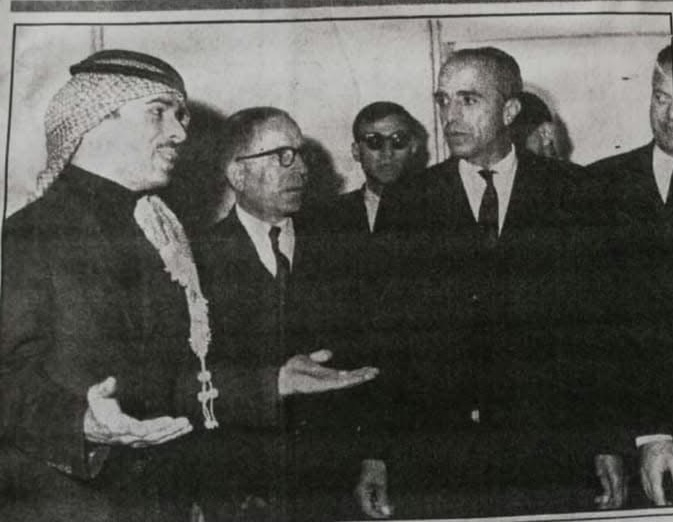
King Hussein of Jordan, during a visit to Irbid Governorate. This visit included a visit to the headquarters of the United Nations Relief and Works Agency for Palestine Refugees in the Near East (UNRWA) in Irbid Governorate. He was received by Ismail Ali Tahboub al-Marwani, Director General of the UNRWA in Irbid Governorate

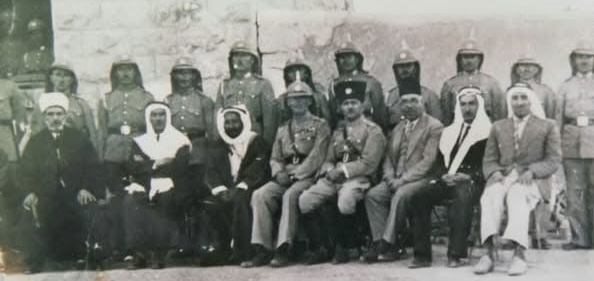
The picture shows the dignitaries of the city of Karak, its judiciary, and officials awaiting the arrival of His Highness the King of Transjordan, Abdullah I, at the train station in Qatraneh, who will arrive from the administration center in Amman. The names of the seated officials present at the Qatraneh railway station from left to right are: Sheikh Arif Tahboub al-Marwani, Mufti of Karak, then Ain Pasha al-Tarawneh, then Faydan al-Majali, then the English commander, then Bahjat Tabbara, then Mahmoud al-Bu Ghanima, Director of Karak Secondary School. The names of the other two are unknown
