= Rula Maayah =

Minister of Tourism and Antiquities

- رولا معايعة
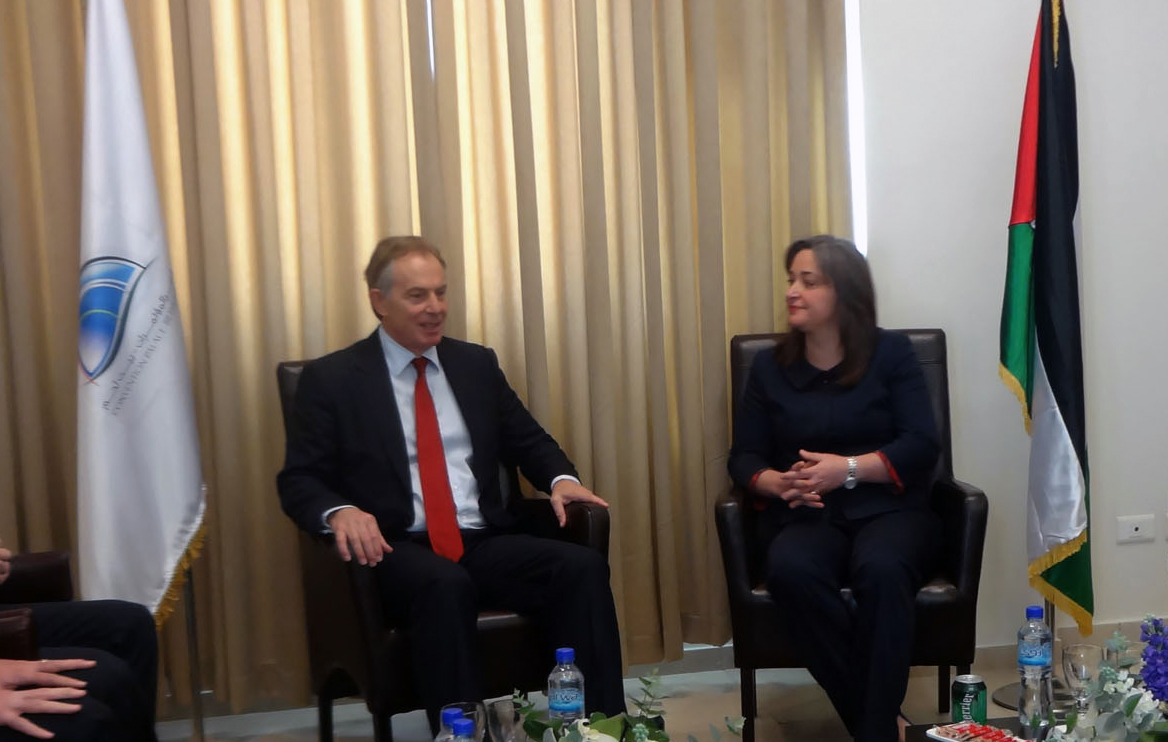

Minister of Tourism and Antiquities
- In office 16 May 2012 – 31 March 2024
- President: Mahmoud Abbas
- Prime Minister: Salam Fayyad; Rami Hamdallah; Mohammad Shtayyeh
- Preceded by: Khouloud Daibes
- Succeeded by: Hani al-Hayek

Personal details
- Born: Rula Nabil Gibran Maaya; 2 August 1970 (age 56) Jerusalem
- Party: Fatah
- Education: Birzeit University; Bethlehem University
- Occupation: Politician

Rula Maayah (Arabic: رولا معايعة; born 2 August 1970) is a Palestinian politician who served as the Minister of Tourism and Antiquities from 2012 to 2013, in the Salam Fayyad government, and from 2013 to 2019, in the Rami Hamdallah government and again from 2019 to 2024, in the Mohammad Shtayyeh government.

== Biography ==
Rula Nabil Gibran Maaya was born on 2 August 1970 in Jerusalem. Maayah is a member of the Fatah political party and has also served in other Palestinian government ministries such as the Ministry of Youth and Sports and the Ministry of Justice. She currently resides in Ramallah and Bethlehem and is a member of The Higher Presidential Committee of Churches Affairs in Palestine.

While Minister of Tourism and Antiquities, Maayah criticised a 2013 exhibition at the Israel Museum displaying artifacts removed from the Herodium in the West Bank for display without consultation. During the 2014 Gaza War, Maayah encouraged the international community to condemn the damage to heritage sites caused by the war.

Maayah described the destruction of cultural heritage during the Gaza war as undermining Palestinian identity. In April 2024, Hani al-Hayek replaced Maayah as Minister of Tourism and Antiquities.

Political offices
Preceded by Khouloud Daibes	Minister of Tourism and Antiquities; 2012–2024	Succeeded by Hani al-Hayek
