= Khouloud Daibes =

Palestinian architect and politician

Khuloud Khalil
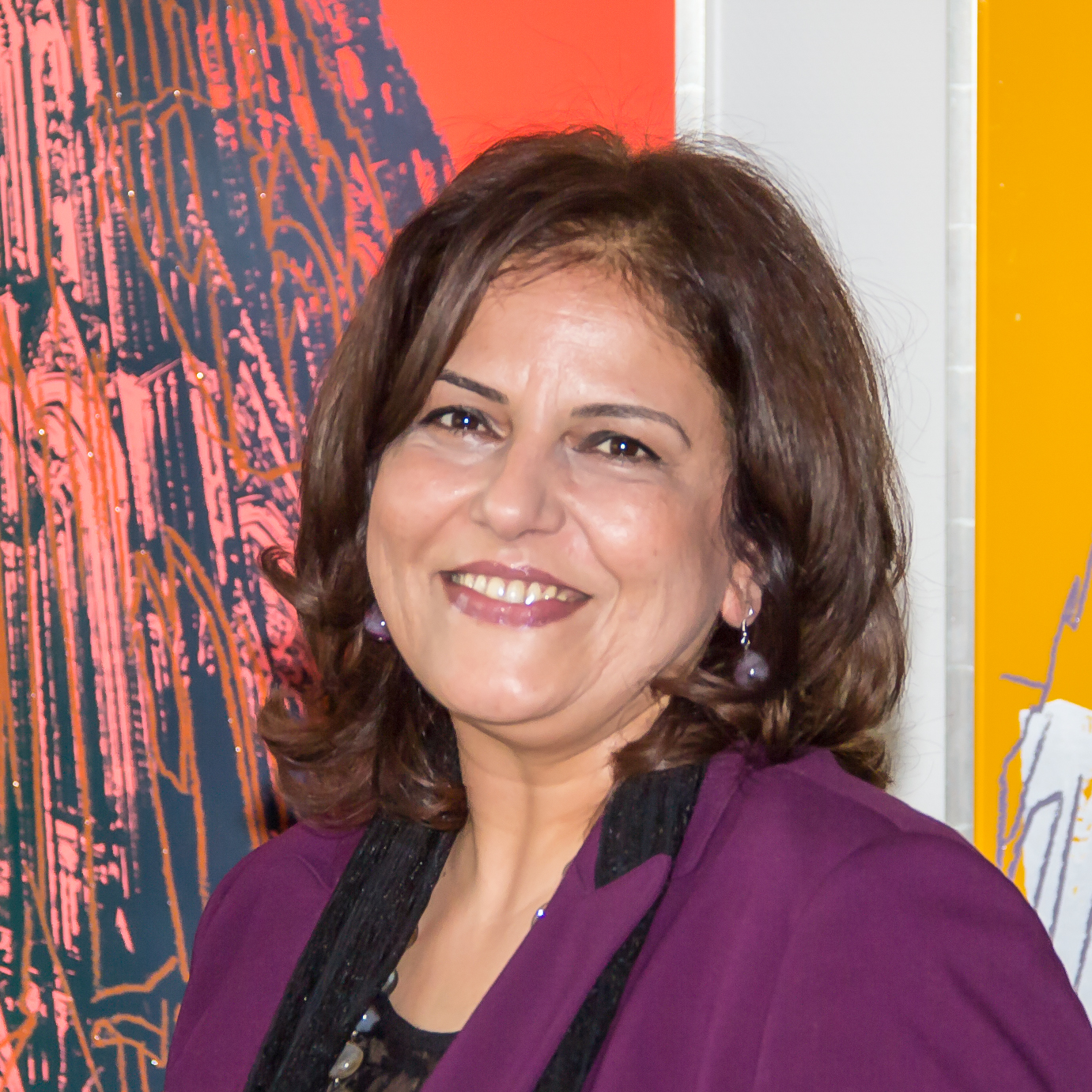
- Khouloud Daibes, 2014

Minister of Tourism and Antiquities
- In office 2007–2012
- President: Mahmoud Abbas
- Succeeded by: Rula Maayah

Personal details
- Born: Khuloud Khalil Daibes; 16 April 1965 (age 60) Zababdeh, West Bank
- Occupation: Architect

Khuloud Khalil Daibes (Arabic: خلود دعيبس), also transliterated as Khouloud D'eibes, is a Palestinian architect and former politician and diplomat. She was born on 16 April 1965 in Jerusalem.

== Career ==
Khuloud Daibes holds a PhD in Architecture from University of Hannover in Germany. She was the Director of the Center for Preserving Cultural Heritage in Bethlehem. She was also a lecturer in the Tourism Masters Program at Bethlehem University. For 15 years, she was involved with many Palestinian and international organizations dealing with cultural heritage and tourism in the Palestinian Territories.

== Positions and rules ==
She served as the Tourism Minister in the Palestinian National Unity Government of March 2007 and successive Palestinian Authority emergency governments until 2012, and from 2007 to 2009 also as Minister of Women's Affairs.

In July 2013, Daibes became the representative of the Palestinian mission in Germany.
