= Hani al-Hayek =

- هاني الحايك
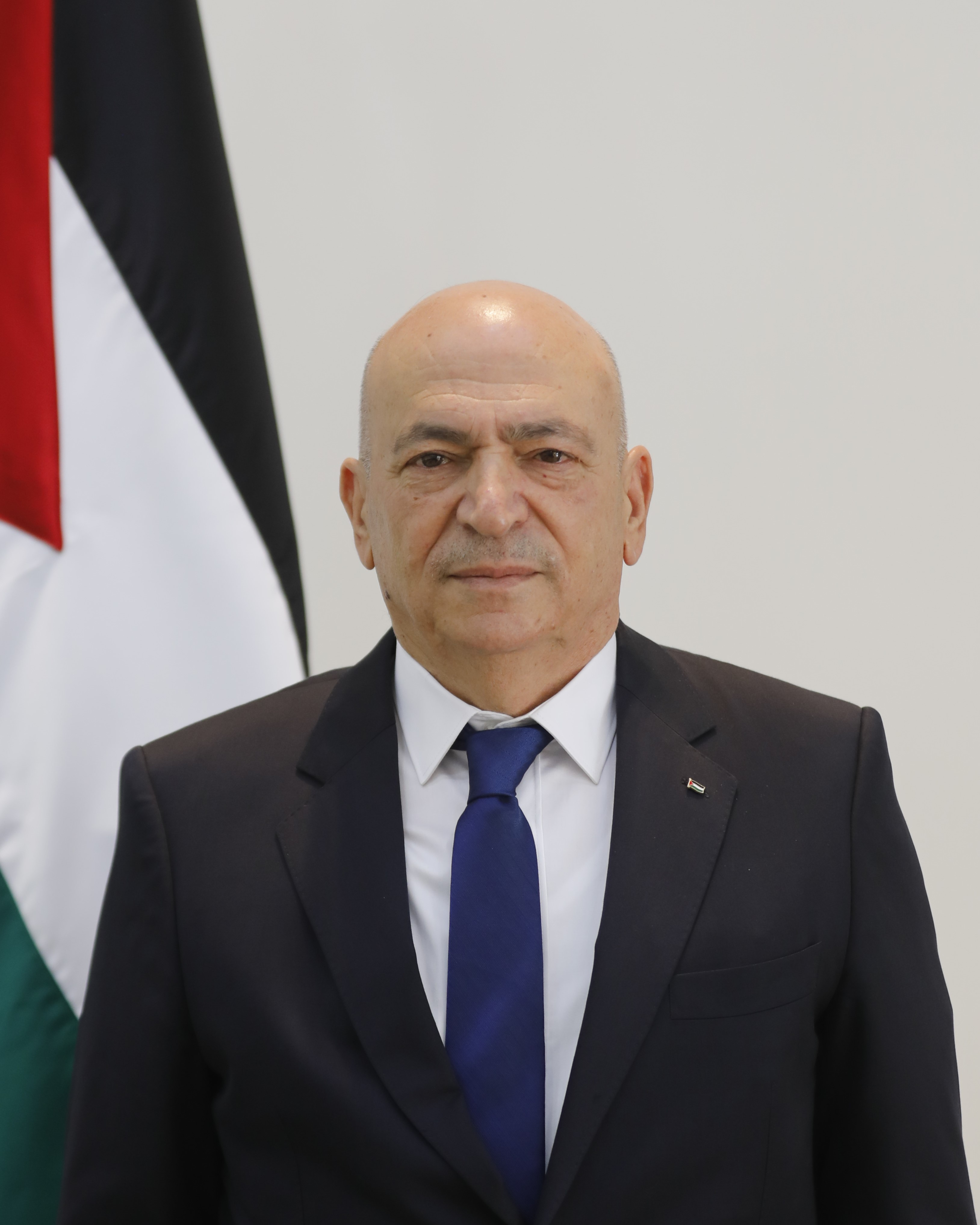
- Hani al-Hayek, Minister of Tourism and Antiquities

Minister of Tourism and Antiquities
- Incumbent
- Assumed office 31 March 2024
- President: Mahmoud Abbas
- Prime Minister: Mohammad Mustafa
- Preceded by: Rula Maayah

Mayor of Beit Sahour
- In office 2022–2024
- In office 2005–2012

Personal details
- Born: Hani Naji Attallah Abd al-Masih al-Hayek; 20 November 1953 (age 72) Beit Sahour, Jordanian-administered West Bank, Palestine
- Party: Fatah
- Children: Khaled al-Hayek, Rasha al-Hayek, Yara al-Hayek, Haya al-Hayek
- Occupation: Politician

Hani al-Hayek (Arabic: هاني الحايك; born 20 November 1953), full name Hani Naji Attallah Abd al-Masih al-Hayek (Arabic: هاني ناجي عطا الله عبد المسيح), is a Palestinian politician who serves as the minister of tourism and antiquities. He was appointed as part of the cabinet led by Prime Minister Mohammad Mustafa in 2024.

== Early life and education ==
Hani al-Hayek was born on 20 November 1953 in Beit Sahour, a predominantly Christian town near Bethlehem in the West Bank. He is a Christian.

== Political and professional career ==
=== Local government ===
Before his appointment as minister, al-Hayek served multiple non-consecutive terms as Mayor of Beit Sahour, including his election in 2022.

=== Minister of tourism and antiquities ===
On 28 March 2024, President Mahmoud Abbas ratified the nineteenth Palestinian government, and appointed al-Hayek as Minister of Tourism and Antiquities, succeeding Rula Maayah in this role. During the handover ceremony, both he and his predecessor stressed the importance of cultural heritage preservation and tourism development as pillars of the Palestinian economy and national narrative.

== Ministerial initiatives and activities ==
=== Cultural heritage preservation ===
As minister, al-Hayek has been advocating for Palestinian archaeological and historical sites. He has highlighted the destruction and damage to heritage sites, in conflict zones like the Gaza Strip.

In July 2026, UNESCO listed Sebastia as a World Heritage site and as a World Heritage site in Danger in light of Israeli settlement and confiscation

=== International cooperation ===
Al-Hayek He met with the ambassador of Venezuela to discuss bilateral tourism cooperation and strategies to attract international visitors. He and the Greek minister of culture signed an action plan for joint efforts in cultural site preservation, focusing on technical exchange and educational programs. He participated in the Paris “Treasures Saved from Gaza” exhibition co-opened with French officials.

== Political views ==
Al-Hayek is a member of Fatah, ans as criticised the impact of the Israeli occupation and conflict on heritage and tourism sectors. He has called for global support for cultural preservation of Palestinian historical sites.

Political offices
| Preceded by – | Mayor of Beit Sahour; 2005–2012 | Succeeded by – |
| Preceded by – | Mayor of Beit Sahour; 2022–2024 | Succeeded by – |
| Preceded by Rula Maayah | Minister of Tourism and Antiquities; 2024–present | Incumbent |
