= Nayef Rajoub =

Palestinian politician and cabinet member

- نايف الرجوب

Minister of Awqaf and Religious Affairs
- In office 29 March 2006 – 17 March 2007
- President: Mahmoud Abbas
- Prime Minister: Ismail Haniyeh
- Preceded by: Yousef Juma Salameh
- Succeeded by: Hussein Tartouri

Member of the Palestinian Legislative Council for Hebron Governorate
- Incumbent
- Assumed office 18 February 2006

Personal details
- Born: Nayef Mahmoud Muhammad Al-Rajoub; 14 May 1958 (age 68) Dura, Hebron Governorate, Jordanian-administered West Bank, Palestine
- Party: Hamas
- Relations: Jibril Rajoub (brother)
- Education: University of Jordan (bachelor's); Hebron University (master's)
- Profession: Politician, author

Sheikh Nayef Al-Rajoub (Arabic: نايف الرجوب; born 14 May 1958) is a Palestinian politician. He has served as a member of the Palestinian Legislative Council since 18 February 2006. He served as Minister of Awqaf and Religious Affairs from 29 March 2006 to 17 March 2007 in the First Haniyeh Government. He became an MP during the 2006 Palestinian legislative elections which was won by Hamas. As a member of the Hamas faction, he was arrested five times by Israel including on 29 June 2006 as part of Israel's Operation Summer Rains.

Nayef Mahmoud Muhammad Al-Rajoub was born in the town of Dura, south of Hebron, on 14 May 1958. He studied Islamic law at the University of Jordan, where he obtained a bachelor's degree, and completed his master's degree at Hebron University in the field of jurisprudence.

Years ago, Major General Jibril Rajoub, Nayef's older brother parted politically years ago with his little brother to the point that in 1996 during a crackdown on Hamas members, then Colonel Jibril led the Preventive Security Force to arrest his own brother even if just for one day. Furthermore, as a member of the rival Fatah party Major General Jibril also ran but lost against Nayef in the 2006 Palestinian legislative elections.

On 26 July 2020, IDF arrested Rajoub from his home in the city of Dura near Hebron.

Political offices
Preceded by Yousef Juma Salameh	Minister of Awqaf and Religious Affairs; 2006–2007	Succeeded by Hussein Tartouri
