= Basem Naim =

Palestinian physician and politician (born 1963)

- باسم نعيم

Minister of Health of the Gaza Strip
- In office 14 June 2007 – 9 September 2012
- Prime Minister: Ismail Haniyeh
- Preceded by: Office established
- Succeeded by: Mufiz al-Makhalalati

Minister of Youth and Sports
- In office 17 March 2007 – 14 June 2007
- Prime Minister: Ismail Haniyeh
- Preceded by: Ismail Haniyeh
- Succeeded by: Tahani Abu Daqqa

Minister of Health
- In office 29 March 2006 – 17 March 2007
- Prime Minister: Ismail Haniyeh
- Preceded by: Thehny al-Wahidi
- Succeeded by: Radwan al-Akhras

Personal details
- Born: 24 January 1963 (age 63) Beit Hanoun, Egyptian-administered Gaza Strip, Palestine
- Party: Hamas
- Profession: Physician; politician

Basem Naim (Arabic: باسم نعيم, romanized: Bāsim Naʿīm; born 24 January 1963) is a Palestinian physician, politician, and Hamas official. Naim served as Minister of Health in the First Haniyeh Government; then, as Minister of Youth and Sports in the Palestinian National Unity Government of March 2007. He resides in Istanbul, Turkey.

== Minister of Health ==
Following the election victory by Hamas, Naim, who holds a degree in medicine from Germany and a PhD in surgery, was named Minister of Health in 2007. As minister, Naim replaced Fatah-affiliated hospital directors and medical staff with Hamas-aligned individuals. One affected professional, Jomaa Alsaqqa, a 20-year surgeon at al-Shifa Hospital, was terminated for his Fatah support. He claims to have been arrested and assaulted by Hamas.

He stepped down in 2012 and became the head of the Council on International Relations in Gaza.

== Gaza war ==
In October 2023, while acting as Hamas's representative in Moscow, Basem participated in a delegation led by senior Hamas member Mousa Abu Marzook, holding talks on foreign hostages in Gaza. Naim has criticised the United States' role in the war.

=== Claims about October 7 attacks ===
In a 12 October 2023 interview with Sky News following the October 7 attacks, Naim said that Hamas did not kill civilians. In an interview with 60 Minutes Australia on 17 October, Naim repeated that Hamas fighters had not committed any crimes. In both cases, interviewers confronted Naim with evidence that hundreds of civilians had been killed in the October 7 attack.

In another interview with Sky News on 16 October, Naim reiterated the claim that no Israeli civilians were killed and shared that the status of the 199 civilians held hostage remains uncertain. He emphasized the difficulty of ascertaining their well-being due to the intense bombardment in Gaza. Naim further stated, "We have communicated to all intermediaries our willingness to release all civilian hostages once the aggression against our people ceases".

== Views ==
Naim had a large following on social media where he often posted anti-Israel and pro-BDS messages. Naim has condemned terror attacks against Jews that occurred in the United States and Germany several times.

Political offices
Preceded by Thehny al-Wahidi	Minister of Health; 2006–2007	Succeeded by Radwan al-Akhras
Preceded by Ismail Haniyeh	Minister of Youth and Sports; 2007	Succeeded by Tahani Abu Daqqa
