= Supreme Muslim Council =

Community authority in Mandatory Palestine

- المجلس الإسلامي الاعلى
- Abbreviation: SMC
- Formation: December 1921
- Dissolved: January 1951
- Headquarters: Mandatory Palestine

The Supreme Muslim Council (SMC; Arabic: المجلس الإسلامي الاعلى, romanized: Al-Majlis al-Islāmī al-Aʻlá) was the highest body in charge of Muslim community affairs in Palestine under British control. It was established to create an advisory body composed of Muslims and Christians with whom the High Commissioner could consult. The Muslim leaders, however, sought to create an independent council to supervise the religious affairs of its community, especially in matters relating to religious trusts (waqf) and shariah courts. The British acceded to these proposals and formed the SMC which controlled waqf funds, the orphan funds, and shariah courts, and responsible for appointing teachers and preachers. The SMC continued to exist until January 1951, when it was dissolved by Jordan and its function transferred to the Jordanian Ministry of Awqaf.

A SMC was reconstituted in the occupied territories in 1967 as the judicial authority of the Muslim community in Israel in matters of personal status of its members under Israel's confessional community system.

There are several Supreme Muslim Councils which administer Muslim affairs in several countries, for example in the Russian Federation and Kenya.

== British Mandate era ==
The High Commissioner of Palestine, Herbert Samuel, issued an order in December 1921 (in anticipation of the start of the British Mandate of Palestine, which did not start till September 1923) establishing a Supreme Muslim Council with authority over all the Muslim waqfs and sharia courts in Palestine. It was to consist of five members—a president and four members, two of whom were to represent the Ottoman district of Jerusalem and the remaining two to represent the Ottoman districts of Nablus and Acre. All were to be paid from government and waqf funds. The SMC had a budget of £50,000.

At the first election, held on 9 January 1922, the fifty-three former electors to the last Ottoman parliament, elected Hajj Amīn al-Husseini as president, by a vote of 40 out of 47. The other members were Muhammad Effendi Murad, 'Abd al-Latif Bey Salah, Sa'id al-Shawa and 'Abd al-Latif al-Dajani. Amin al-Husayni had previously been made Grand Mufti of Jerusalem by Samuel following the death of his half-brother, Kamil al-Husayni, on 31 March 1921. Amīn al-Tamīmī was appointed as acting president when Amīn al-Husayni was abroad, The secretaries appointed were ‘Abdallah Shafĩq and Muhammad al’Afĩfĩ and from 1928–1930 the secretary was Amin's relative Jamāl al-Husaynī, Sa’d al Dīn al-Khaţīb and later another of the Amīn al-Husayni's relatives ‘Alī al-Husaynī, ‘Ajaj Nuwayhid, a Druze was an adviser.

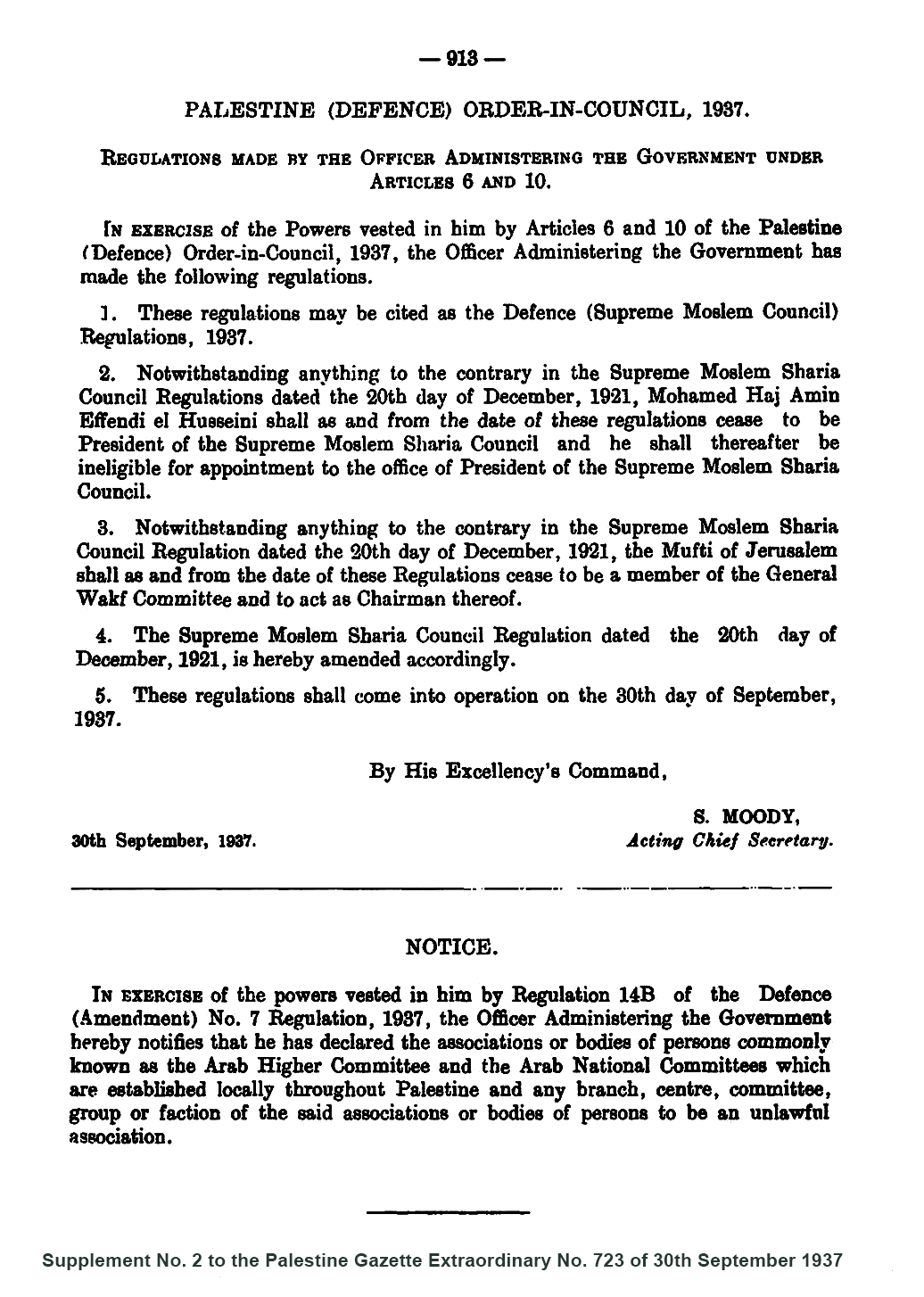
Dismissal of Amin al-Husseini from the Supreme Muslim Council and outlawing of the Arab Higher Committee

In 1924, the SMC accepted Hussein bin Ali, the Sharif of Mecca, as the custodian of Al Aqsa mosque compound. The custodianship then became a Hashemite legacy administered by consecutive Jordanian kings. The president of SMC had the powers of employment over all Muslim officials throughout Palestine. The Anglo American committee termed it a powerful political machine. Amin rarely delegated authority, and most of the SMC's executive work was carried out by Amīn al-Husayni. Nepotism and favoritism played a central part to Amīn al-Husayni's tenure as president of the SMC.

Subsequent elections were held in 1926, 1929, and 1930, though the 1926 election was annulled by the High Court of Justice and its members chosen by the Mandatory government.

The Arab Higher Committee was established on 25 April 1936, after the start of the 1936–1939 Arab revolt. Amin al-Husayni was president and included several member of the Supreme Muslim Council, including Jamal al-Husayni and Yaqub al-Ghusayn. The AHC was outlawed on 1 October 1937 following the assassination of the Acting District Commissioner for Galilee Lewis Yelland Andrews by Galilean members of the Black Hand (Mandatory Palestine) group on 26 September. The British commenced to arrest the members of the AHC, including members of the SMC who were on the AHC, but Amin al-Husayni fled the country to avoid arrest. Amin al-Husayni's position as president of the Supreme Muslim Council was terminated. The SMC continued to function, but its authority and structure were reconfigured. Government oversight of the waqf and shari‘a court systems was instituted, and all appointments to religious positions were made subject to the High Commissioner's approval.

== Post-Mandate period ==
The SMC continued in existence under the British but was dissolved in 1948 after Jordan occupied Jerusalem. The Supreme Muslim Council was dismantled in January 1951 by Jordan, and all the Palestinian waqf (charitable institutions) and the juridical system was placed under the control of the Jordanian Ministry of Awqaf. The SMC had already been crippled by the loss of vast properties in areas that became the territory of Israel.

== Current status ==
The Supreme Muslim Council was reconstituted in Jerusalem under Israeli rule after the Six-Day War in 1967. It is the judicial authority of the Muslim community in Israel in matters of personal status of its members under Israel's confessional community system.

Hasan Tahboub was the head of the SMC (1993–1998) and Minister of Waqf and Religious Affairs in the Palestinian Authority (1994–1998). In 2006, Na'if Rajoub was the Palestinian minister in charge of the Waqf.

== See also ==
- Hashemite custodianship of Jerusalem holy sites
- Palace Hotel (Jerusalem)
