= Hashemite custodianship of Jerusalem holy sites =

Jordanian custodianship of sites in Jerusalem

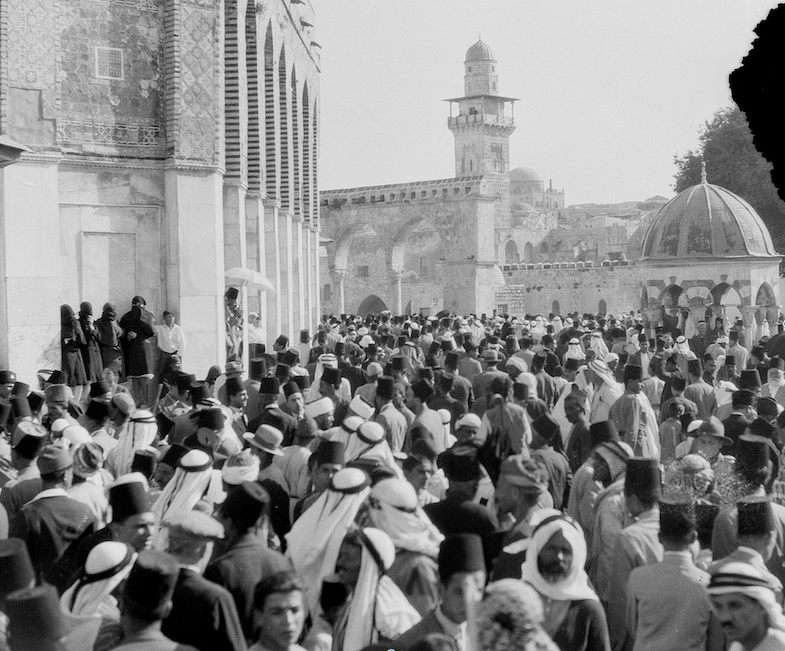
Sharif Hussein's funeral in Jerusalem on 4 June 1931

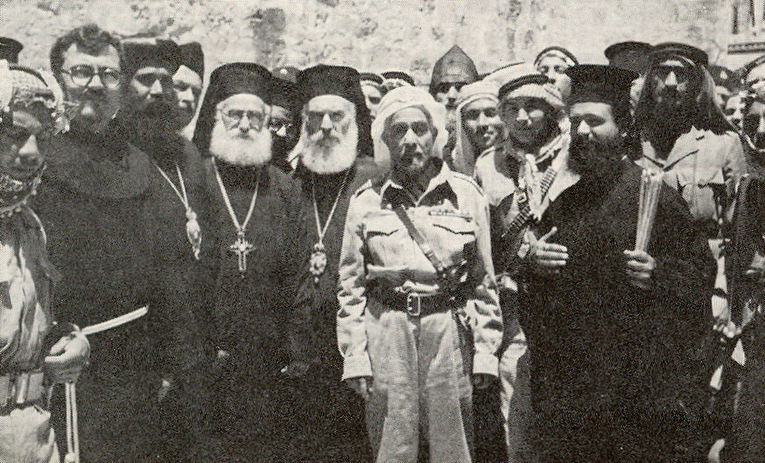
King Abdullah I welcomed by Palestinian Christians in East Jerusalem on 29 May 1948, the day after his forces took control over the city

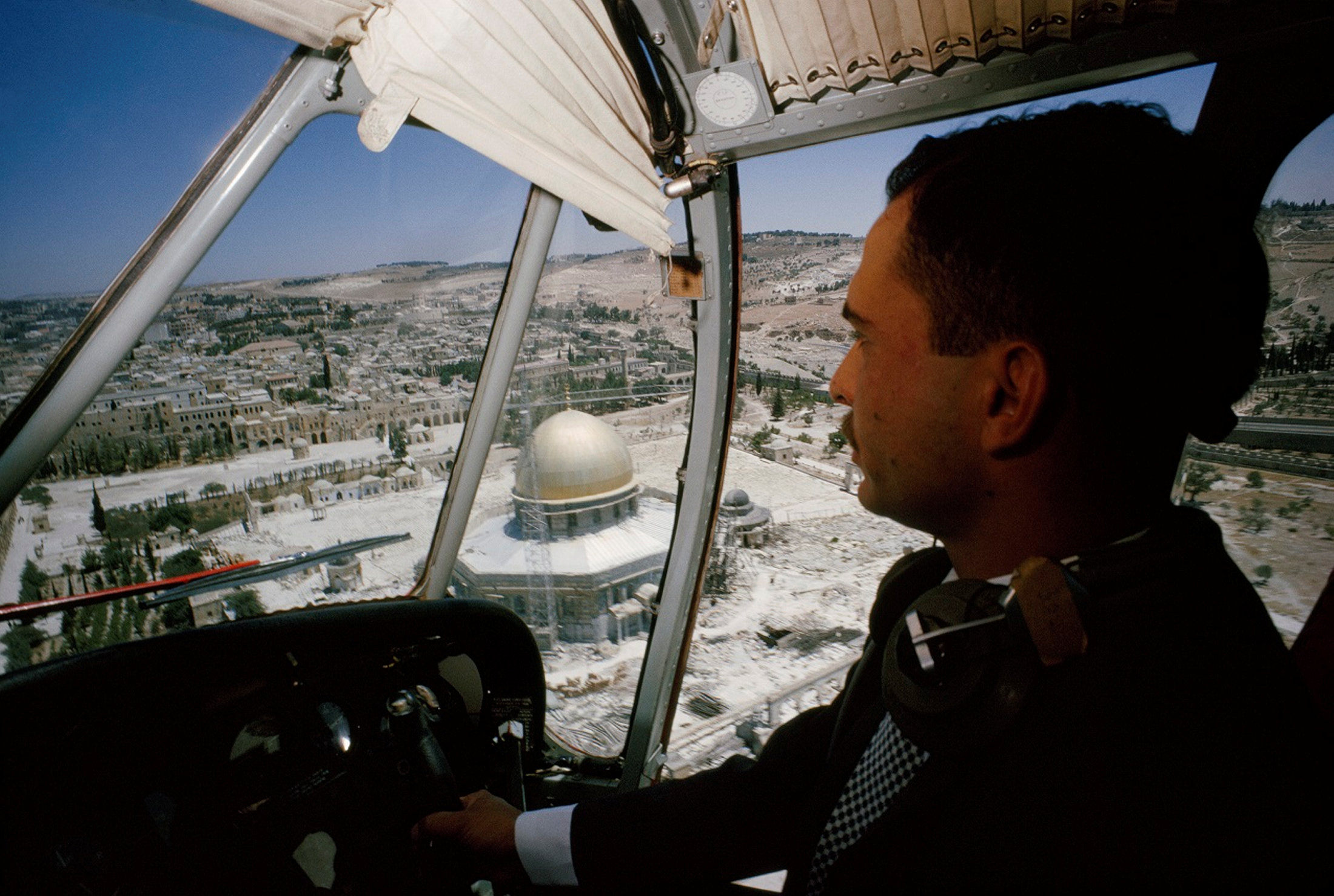
King Hussein flying over the Dome of the Rock in East Jerusalem while the West Bank was still under Jordanian control, 1964

Hashemite custodianship refers to the Jordanian royal family's role in tending Muslim and Christian holy sites in the city of Jerusalem. The legacy traces back to 1924 when the Supreme Muslim Council, the highest Muslim body in charge of Muslim community affairs in Mandatory Palestine, chose Hussein bin Ali (Sharif of Mecca) as custodian of Al-Aqsa. The custodianship became a Hashemite legacy administered by consecutive Jordanian kings.

Jordan controlled East Jerusalem and the West Bank in 1948, and annexed the territories in 1951 until they were lost to Israel during the 1967 Six-Day War. Jordan renounced claims to the territory in 1988, and signed a peace treaty with Israel in 1994, whose ninth article states that Israel commits to "respect the present special role of the Hashemite Kingdom of Jordan in Muslim Holy shrines in Jerusalem" and that "when negotiations on the permanent status will take place, Israel will give high priority to the Jordanian historic role in these shrines." In 2013, an agreement between Jordan and the Palestinian Authority recognized Jordan's role in Jerusalem's Muslim and Christian holy sites.

Al-Aqsa and the Dome of the Rock were renovated four times by the Hashemite dynasty during the 20th century. In 2016, King Abdullah II participated in funding renovation of Christ's tomb in the Church of the Holy Sepulchre, and in 2017, Abdullah donated $1.4 million to the Jerusalem Islamic Waqf, the Jordanian authority responsible for administering Al-Aqsa. An independent report estimates the total amount that Jordan and the Hashemites have spent since 1924 on administering and renovating Al Aqsa as over $1 billion.

Intermittent violence at the Temple Mount between the Israeli Army and Palestinians evolves into diplomatic disputes between Israel and Jordan.

== Background ==
The Temple Mount is the holiest site in Judaism. Among Sunni Muslims, the Temple Mount is widely considered the third holiest site in Islam. Revered as the location where, according to legend, Muhammad ascended to heaven, the site, known as the "Noble Sanctuary", is also associated with Jewish prophets who are venerated in Muslim religion. The Al-Aqsa Mosque and Dome of the Rock were constructed on the mount by Umayyad Caliphs. In 692 AD, the dome was constructed, making it one of the oldest Islamic shrines to exist.

== History ==
=== Mandatory Palestine verbal agreement: 1924–1948 ===
The legacy traces back a 1924 verbal agreement when the Supreme Muslim Council, the highest Muslim body in charge of Muslim community affairs in Mandatory Palestine, accepted Hussein bin Ali (Hashemite Sharif of Mecca) as custodian of Al-Aqsa. The Hashemites are descendants of Muhammad, who ruled over the Islamic holy city of Mecca for 700 years until they were ousted by the House of Saud in 1924. The custodianship became a Hashemite legacy administered by consecutive Jordanian kings. Sharif Hussein was buried in 1931 near the Al-Aqsa mosque where his funeral also took place.

=== Jordanian control period: 1948–1967 ===
The sharif's son, Abdullah I (the first King of Jordan) is said to have personally extinguished a fire which engulfed the Church of the Holy Sepulchre in 1949. Jordan under Abdullah I had occupied East Jerusalem and the West Bank during the 1948 Arab–Israeli War and annexed the territories in 1951. Abdullah I was assassinated a year later as he was entering the mosque to pray. King Hussein in 1965 ordered the construction of a palace in East Jerusalem in 1965 to symbolize Jordan's sovereignty. It was abandoned after Jordan lost control of the West Bank to Israel during the 1967 Six-Day War, and the palace remains uncompleted to this day.

=== Israeli peace treaty: 1994 onwards ===
Jordan renounced claims to the territory in 1988, and signed a peace treaty with Israel in 1994, whose ninth article states that Israel commits to "respect the present special role of the Hashemite Kingdom of Jordan in Muslim Holy shrines in Jerusalem" and that "when negotiations on the permanent status will take place, Israel will give high priority to the Jordanian historic role in these shrines".

=== Palestinian–Jordanian agreement: 2013 onwards ===
In 2013 an agreement was signed between the Palestinian Authority (represented by Mahmoud Abbas) and King Abdullah II recognizing Jordan's role, replacing the decades-old verbal agreement.

== Recent events ==
Jordan recalled its ambassador to Israel in 2014 following tensions at Al-Aqsa Mosque between Israelis and Palestinians. Abdullah met Israeli prime minister Benjamin Netanyahu in Amman in late 2014, and the Jordanian ambassador returned when Israeli authorities eased restrictions and allowed men of all ages to pray at Al-Aqsa for the first time in months.

For You, Your Majesty, the King of the beloved Jordan, are the Custodian of the Islamic and Christian holy sites in Jerusalem, including the Holy Sepulchre and the Greek Orthodox Patriarchate of Jerusalem. This Custodianship that forms a shield of protection and an extension to the Omary Covenant that took place between the Patriarch Sophronius and Caliph Omar Ibn Al Khattab. We are keeping this covenant with you until God inherits the earth.

— Patriarch Theophilos III of Jerusalem, during a joint Jordanian–Palestinian Christmas celebration in 2018

In 2016, King Abdullah II participated in funding renovation of Christ's tomb in the Church of the Holy Sepulchre, and in 2017, Abdullah donated $1.4 million to the Jerusalem Islamic Waqf, the Jordanian authority responsible for administering Al-Aqsa. An independent report estimates the total amount that the Hashemites have spent since 1924 on administering and renovating Al Aqsa as over $1 billion. The Greek Orthodox Patriarch of Jerusalem commenting on the King's donation to the renovation of the Church: "Jordan’s role in protecting Christian existence in the Holy Land is clear and undeniable, King Abdullah spearheads the efforts of all Jordanians to sow the seeds of love and brotherhood between Muslims and Christians. We are reaping the fruits of these efforts in this age when sectarian wars are burning entire countries as can plainly be seen."

On 24 July, following the 2017 Temple Mount crisis, Israel agreed to remove metal detectors from Al-Aqsa after Abdullah phoned Netanyahu. However, it is unclear if Jordan influenced Israel's decision.

Leaders of the Church of the Holy Sepulchre issued a statement of support to Abdullah on 1 March 2018 after Israel shelved a proposed bill that aimed to propose new tax measures to churches in the West Bank. "Your defence of religious freedom and Your leadership, in ensuring that the Status Quo is respected and maintained, has been crucial in our ongoing attempts to guard and protect the Christian presence especially in the Holy City of Jerusalem", the statement read.

Bernard Sabela, an Arab Christian Jerusalemite and a retired sociology professor from the Bethlehem University, told The Jordan Times in early 2019 that he compares Jordan's role "..to a bright moon in a dark night when there are no other stars." He added: "We in Jerusalem feel that Jordan, and in spite of all the pressures, challenges and waves of refugees, is still constant in its support and strongly attached to Jerusalem and its holy sites. This is not merely rhetoric… Jordan does not only take stands, but also translates them into actions."

== Recognition ==
Israel, the Palestinian Authority, the Arab League, United States, European Union and Turkey recognize Jordan's role.

In December 2017, Federica Mogherini, the European Union foreign policy chief said that "Jordan has a very special role, when it comes to the holy places, His Majesty, the King of Jordan Abdullah II, is the custodian of the holy places and he is a very wise man."
