= Aly Tewfik Shousha =

Egyptian doctor (1891–1964)

Sir Aly Tewfik Shousha Pasha
- علي توفيق شوشة
- Born: 17 August 1891; Cairo, Khedivate of Egypt
- Died: 31 May 1964 (aged 72)
- Occupation: Bacteriologist
- Awards: Order of the Nile (1936); US Typhus Commission Medal (1944); Order of Pashwiya (1945); Order of the British Empire (Knight Commander 1948)

Academic background
- Education: Humboldt University of Berlin (MD, 1915); University of Zurich

Sir Aly Tewfik Shousha, Pasha (Arabic: علي توفيق شوشة; 17 August 1891 – 31 May 1964) was an Egyptian doctor and a founding member of the World Health Organization.

== Early life and education ==
Aly Tewfik Shousha was born in Cairo, on 17 August 1891. He graduated from the School of Medicine, Humboldt University of Berlin in 1915, and specialized in the study of bacteriology at the University of Zurich. He later became an assistant at the Hygienische Institute in Zurich (1916–1917).

== Career ==
Shousha returned to Egypt to serve as a bacteriologist in 1924, before he served as a Director of Laboratories of the Ministry of Public Health in 1930. He then became the Undersecretary of the Ministry of Health in 1939. On 1 July 1949, he became the first Regional Director of the Eastern Mediterranean Region of the World Health Organization (WHO) at its inception. He was also one of WHO's founding members and the Chairman of the Executive Board of WHO.

Shousha published many articles on bacteriology, including immunology. He contributed to the editing of the facilitated Arabic Encyclopedia, and was elected to the Academy of the Arabic Language in Cairo in 1942.

== Death ==
Shousha died on 31 May 1964, aged 72, while he was attending the WHO Executive Board meeting in Geneva. He was attending as a representative of the League of Arab States, whose health activities he directed.

== Awards and honours ==
Shousha's many decorations include Order of the Nile in 1936, the US Typhus Commission Medal in 1944, Order of Pashwiya on 26 April 1945, and Commander and then Knight Commander of the Order of the British Empire in 1948. A street in Nasr City, Cairo, was named after him.

In 1966, the ninth World Health Assembly established a foundation to honour his memory as one of the World Health Organization founders and first WHO Regional Director for the Eastern Mediterranean. The foundation's purpose is to award a prize known as the Shousha Prize, which is given to a person who made the most significant contribution to any health problem in the geographical area in which Dr Shousha served the WHO. The foundation also gives a fellowship every six years that amounts to US$15,000.
