= Hasan Tahboub =

Palestinian imam and politician (1923–1998)

Hasan Fateen Tahboub al-Marwani
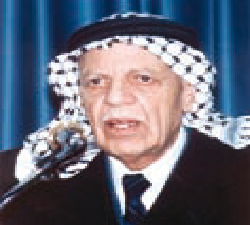

Head of the Supreme Muslim Council in Jerusalem
- In office 1993–1998

Minister of Waqf and Religious Affairs in the Palestinian Authority
- In office 1994–1998

Director General of Waqf in the West Bank and Jerusalem
- In office 1960–1984

Personal details
- Born: July 1923 Hebron, Southern West Bank
- Died: 27 April 1998 (aged 74) Amman, Jordan

Hasan Fateen Tahboub (حسن فطين طهبوب; July 1923 – April 1998), or Hasan al-Marwani (حسن فطين المرواني), was a leader of the Arab community in Jerusalem, Head of the Supreme Muslim Council in Jerusalem (1993–1998) and Minister of Waqf and Religious Affairs in the Palestinian Authority (1994–1998). He was born in the southern West Bank city of Hebron into the Tahboub (Al-Marwani) family which had a notable role in managing the Islamic Waqf in Palestine for many centuries.

Tahboub spent most of his life managing and defending the Islamic Waqf in Jerusalem and the West Bank since he joined the Waqf department of Palestine in 1947. He was Director General of Waqf in the West Bank (1960–1984) and Jerusalem during the Jordanian era.

Tahboub's father, Fateen Tahboub was a member of the 5th Jordanian Parliament representing Hebron, elected in 1958.

Hasan Tahboub died in Amman, Jordan on April 27, 1998 and was buried in the Old City of Jerusalem, near the Lions' Gate.
