= Ismail Haniyeh =

Palestinian politician (c.1962–2024)

- إسماعيل هنية
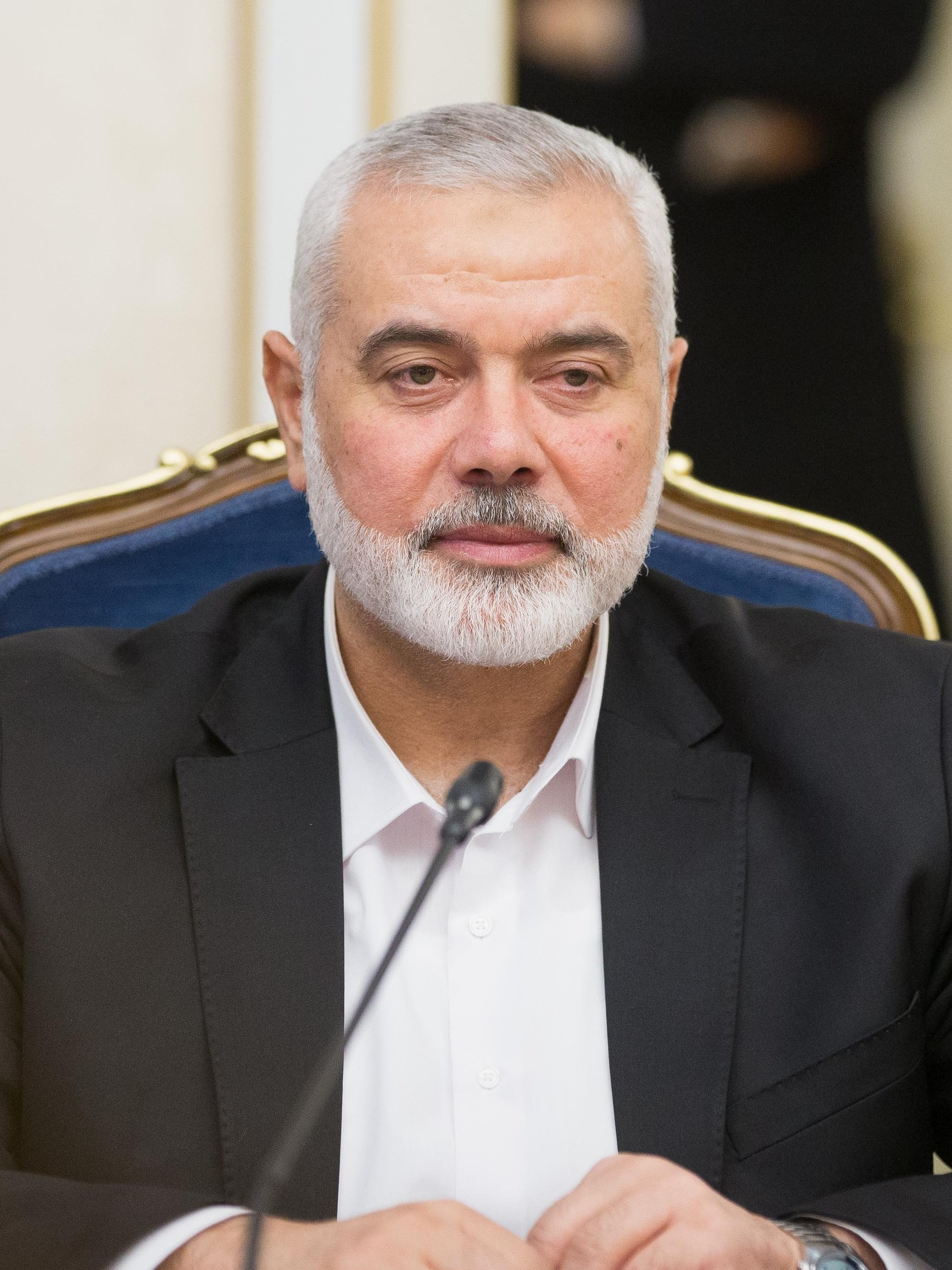
- Haniyeh in 2020

3rd Chairman of the Hamas Political Bureau
- In office 6 May 2017 – 31 July 2024 (Note: He was already seen by 2004 as the de facto leader.)
- Deputy: Saleh al-Arouri
- Preceded by: Khaled Mashal
- Succeeded by: Khaled Mashal (acting); Yahya Sinwar

2nd Deputy Chairman of the Hamas Political Bureau
- In office 4 April 2013 – 6 May 2017
- Chairman: Khaled Mashal
- Preceded by: Mousa Abu Marzook
- Succeeded by: Saleh al-Arouri

1st Hamas leader in the Gaza Strip
- In office 11 June 2007 – 13 February 2017
- Preceded by: Position created (Note: After Hamas took control of Gaza in 2007, Haniyeh served as the de-facto leader of Gaza Strip after a dispute with President Mahmoud Abbas. However, their rule over Gaza Strip was never recognized by any state. Haniyeh formed the government in the Gaza Strip on the same month.)
- Succeeded by: Yahya Sinwar

Prime Minister of the Palestinian National Authority
- In office 29 March 2006 – 2 June 2014; Disputed: 14 June 2007 – 6 January 2013 (Note: Haniyeh was dismissed on 14 June 2007 by Abbas, who appointed Salam Fayyad instead. This was deemed illegal by the Legislative Council, which continued to recognise Haniyeh. The Palestinian Authority governs the West Bank while Hamas governs the Gaza Strip. A unity government was formed in 2014.)
- President: Mahmoud Abbas (Ramallah); Aziz Dweik (Gaza Strip)
- Preceded by: Ahmed Qurei
- Succeeded by: Rami Hamdallah (as Prime Minister of the State of Palestine)

Minister of Youth and Sports
- In office 29 March 2006 – 17 March 2007
- President: Mahmoud Abbas
- Prime Minister: Himself
- Preceded by: Sakhr Bseiso
- Succeeded by: Basem Naim

Member of the Palestinian Legislative Council
- In office 18 February 2006 – 31 July 2024

4th Chairman of the Hamas Political Bureau in the Gaza Strip
- In office 11 June 2007 – 13 February 2017
- Preceded by: Nizar Awadallah
- Succeeded by: Yahya Sinwar

Personal details
- Born: Ismail Abd al-Salah Ahmad Haniyeh; 29 January 1962 (Note: There are contradictory reports on his date of birth: 23 January 1962 or 1963; or 8 May 1963) Al-Shati refugee camp, Egyptian-administered Gaza Strip, Palestine
- Died: 31 July 2024 (aged 62) Tehran, Iran
- Cause of death: Assassination
- Resting place: Lusail royal cemetery, Lusail, Qatar
- Party: Hamas
- Spouse: Amal
- Children: 13 (Note: Three killed in an Israeli airstrike on 10 April 2024.)
- Education: Islamic University of Gaza (BA)

Ismail Haniyeh (Note: Sometimes transliterated as Haniya, Haniyah, Hanieh, or Haniyyeh.) (Arabic: إسماعيل هنية, romanized: Ismāʿīl Haniyyah,; (Note: Full name: Ismail Abd al-Salam Ahmad Haniyeh; Arabic: إسماعيل عبد السلام احمد هنية, romanized: Ismāʿīl Abd al-Salam Ahmad Haniyyah.) 29 January 1962 – 31 July 2024) was a Palestinian politician who served as third chairman of the Hamas Political Bureau from May 2017 until his assassination in July 2024. He also served as the prime minister of the Palestinian National Authority from March 2006 until June 2014 and the first Hamas leader in the Gaza Strip from June 2007 until February 2017, where he was succeeded by Yahya Sinwar.

Haniyeh was born in the al-Shati refugee camp in the then Egyptian-administered Gaza Strip in 1962 or 1963, to parents who were expelled or fled from Al-Jura (now part of Ashkelon) during the 1948 Palestine war. He earned a bachelor's degree in Arabic literature from the Islamic University of Gaza in 1987, where he first became involved with Hamas, which was formed during the First Intifada against the Israeli occupation. His involvement led to his imprisonment for three short periods after participating in protests. After his release in 1992, he was exiled to Lebanon, returning a year later to become a dean at Gaza's Islamic University. Haniyeh was appointed to head a Hamas office in 1997 and subsequently rose in the ranks of the organization.

Haniyeh was head of the Hamas list that won the Palestinian legislative elections of 2006, which campaigned on armed resistance against Israel, and so became Prime Minister of the State of Palestine. However, Mahmoud Abbas, the Palestinian president, dismissed Haniyeh from office on 14 June 2007. Due to the then-ongoing Fatah–Hamas conflict, Haniyeh did not acknowledge Abbas' decree and continued to exercise prime ministerial authority in the Gaza Strip. Haniyeh was the leader of Hamas in the Gaza Strip from 2006 until February 2017, when he was replaced by Yahya Sinwar. Haniyeh was seen by many diplomats as one of the more pragmatic and moderate figures in Hamas. From 2017 until his assassination in 2024, he had mostly lived in Qatar.

On 6 May 2017, Haniyeh was elected chairman of Hamas's Political Bureau, replacing Khaled Mashal; at the time, Haniyeh relocated from the Gaza Strip to Qatar. Under his tenure, Hamas launched the October 7 attacks, and subsequently Israel declared its intention to assassinate all Hamas leaders. In May 2024, Karim Khan, the prosecutor of the International Criminal Court, announced his intention to apply for an arrest warrant for Haniyeh, and other Hamas leaders, for war crimes and crimes against humanity, as part of the ICC investigation in Palestine. On 31 July 2024, Haniyeh was assassinated by an explosive device planted in his guesthouse in Tehran, likely by Israeli Mossad agents. At the time of his death, he had been leading cease-fire negotiations with Israel for Hamas.

== Early life and education ==
Ismail Abdulsalam Ahmed Haniyeh was born to a family of Muslim Palestinians in the al-Shati refugee camp of the Egyptian-administered Gaza Strip, Palestine. His parents were expelled or fled from Al-Jura in what is now Ashkelon during the 1948 Palestine war, part of the territory where Israel was then established. In his youth, he worked in Israel to support his family. He attended United Nations–run schools and graduated from the Islamic University of Gaza with a degree in Arabic literature in 1987. He became involved with Hamas while at university. From 1985 to 1986, he was head of the students' council representing the Muslim Brotherhood. He played as a midfielder in the Islamic Association football team. He graduated at about the time that the First Intifada against the Israeli occupation broke out, during which he participated in protests against Israel.

== Early activism ==
Haniyeh participated in protests in the First Intifada and was given a short prison sentence by an Israeli military court. He was detained by Israel again in 1988 and imprisoned for six months. In 1989, he was imprisoned for three years.

Following his release in 1992, the Israeli military authorities of the occupied Palestinian territories exiled him to Lebanon with senior Hamas leaders Abdel-Aziz al-Rantissi, Mahmoud Zahhar, Aziz Duwaik, and 400 other activists. The activists stayed at Marj al-Zahour in southern Lebanon for over a year, where, according to BBC News, Hamas "received unprecedented media exposure and became known throughout the world". A year later, he returned to Gaza and was appointed dean of the Islamic University.

== Political career ==
=== Hamas ===
After Israel released Ahmed Yassin from prison in 1997, Haniyeh was appointed to head his office. His prominence within Hamas grew due to his relationship with Yassin and he was appointed as the representative to the Palestinian Authority. His position within Hamas continued to strengthen during the Second Intifada due to his relationship with Yassin, and because of the assassinations of much of the Hamas leadership by the Israeli security forces. He was targeted by the Israel Defense Forces for his alleged involvement in attacks against Israeli citizens. Following a suicide bombing in Jerusalem in 2003, he was slightly injured on his hand by an Israeli Air Force bomb attack attempting to eliminate the Hamas leadership. In December 2005, Haniyeh was elected to head the Hamas list, which won the Legislative Council elections the following month. Haniyeh succeeded Khaled Mashaal's head leadership of Hamas in elections held in 2016.

=== Prime minister ===
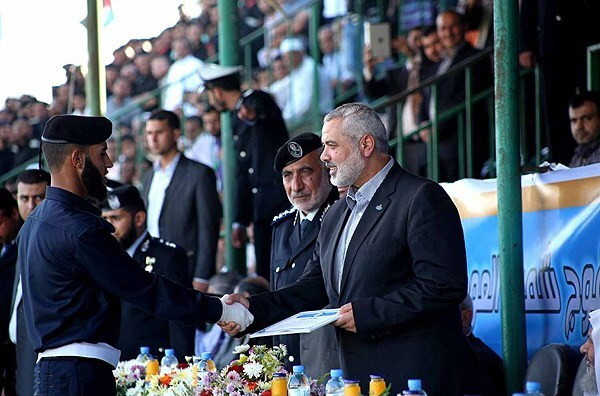
Graduation ceremony of police forces in Gaza, 16 June 2012

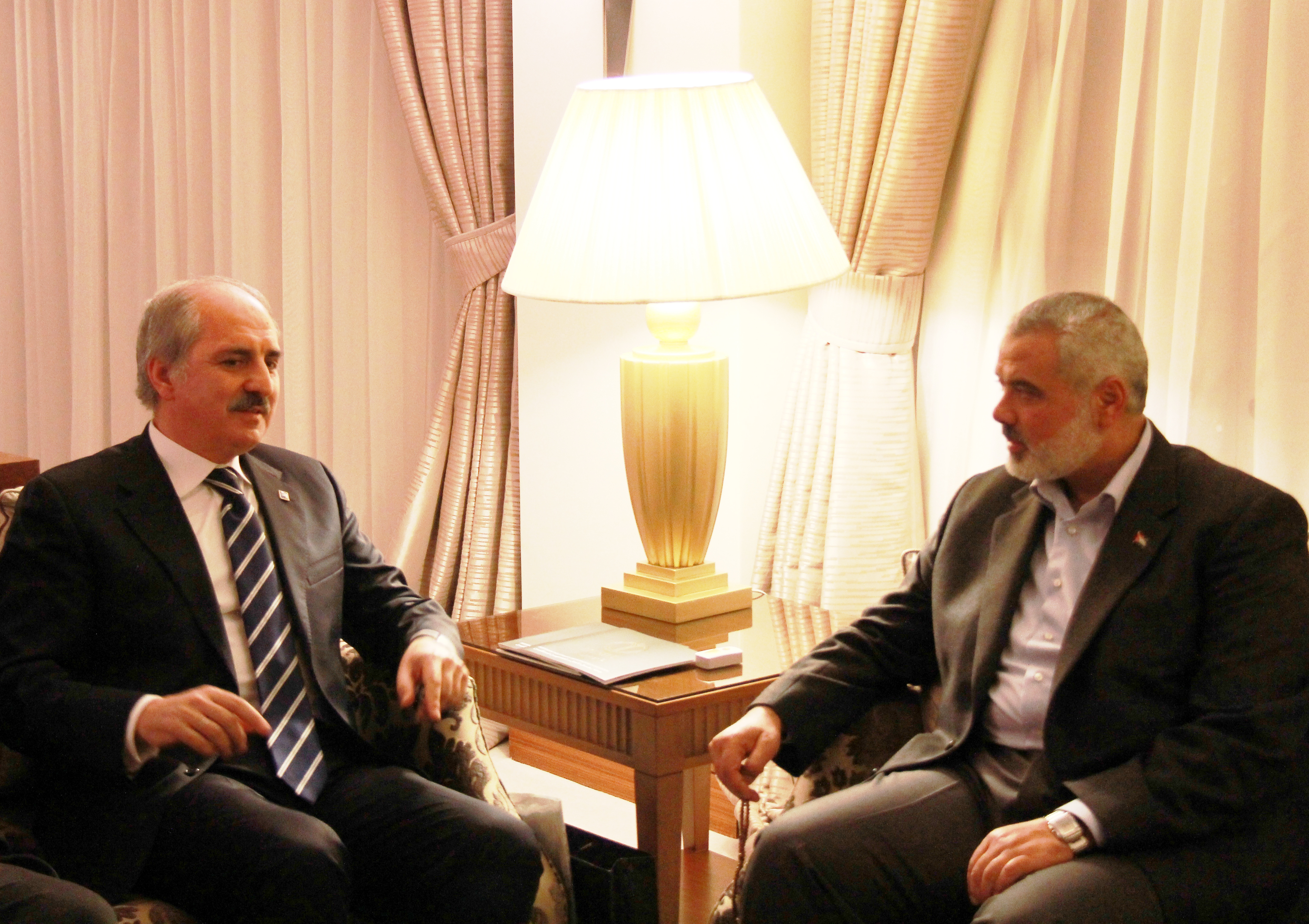
Haniyeh with Turkish Minister of Culture Numan Kurtulmuş, 20 November 2012

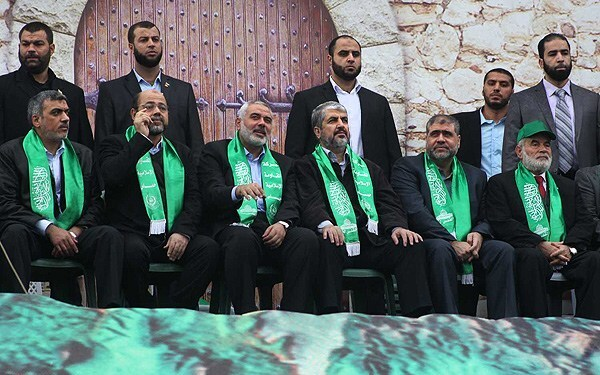
Haniyeh and Khaled Mashal in Gaza, 8 December 2012

Haniyeh was nominated as prime minister on 16 February 2006 following the Hamas "List of Change and Reform" victory on 25 January 2006. He was formally presented to president Mahmoud Abbas on 20 February and was sworn in on 29 March 2006.

==== Western reaction ====
Israel implemented a series of punitive measures, including economic sanctions, against the Palestinian Authority following the election. Acting Prime Minister Ehud Olmert, announced that Israel would not transfer to the Palestinian Authority an estimated $50 million per month in tax receipts that were collected by Israel on behalf of the Palestinian Authority. Haniyeh dismissed the sanctions, stating that Hamas would neither disarm nor would it recognize Israel.

Haniyeh expressed regret that Hamas was subjected to punitive measures, adding that "it [Israel] should have responded differently to the democracy expressed by the Palestinian people".

The United States demanded that $50 million in unexpended foreign aid funds for the Palestinian Authority be returned to the United States, which Palestinian Economic Minister Mazen Sonokrot agreed to do. On the loss of foreign aid from the United States and the European Union, Haniyeh commented that: "The West is always using its donations to apply pressure on the Palestinian people."

Several months after Hamas' 2006 election victory, Haniyeh sent a letter to U.S. President George W. Bush, in which he called on the "American government to have direct negotiations with the elected government", offered a long-term truce with Israel, while accepting a Palestinian state within the 1967 borders and urged an end to the international boycott, claiming that it would "encourage violence and chaos". The U.S. government did not respond and maintained its boycott.

==== Dispute with Abbas ====
An agreement with Abbas was to have been reached to stop Abbas's call for new elections. On 20 October 2006, on the eve of this deal to end factional fighting between Fatah and Hamas, Haniyeh's convoy came under gunfire in Gaza and one of the cars was set on fire. Haniyeh was not hurt in the attack. Hamas sources said that this was not an assassination attempt. Palestinian Authority security sources reported that the attackers were the relatives of a Fatah man killed by clashes with Hamas.

==== Denied re-entry to Gaza ====
During the simmering Fatah–Hamas conflict, on 14 December 2006, Haniyeh was denied entry to Gaza from Egypt at the Rafah Border Crossing. The border crossing was closed by order of Israeli Minister of Defence Amir Peretz. Haniyeh was returning to Gaza from his first official trip abroad as prime minister. He was carrying an estimated US$30 million in cash, intended for Palestinian Authority payments. Israeli authorities later stated that they would allow Haniyeh to cross the border provided he left the money in Egypt, which would reportedly be transferred to an Arab League bank account. A gun battle between Hamas militants and the Palestinian Presidential Guard was reported at the Rafah Border Crossing in response to the incident. The EU monitors who operated the crossing were reportedly evacuated safely. When Haniyeh later attempted to cross the border, an exchange of gunfire left one bodyguard dead and Haniyeh's eldest son wounded. Hamas denounced the incident as an attempt by rival Fatah on Haniyeh's life, prompting firefights in the West Bank and Gaza Strip between Hamas and Fatah forces. Haniyeh was quoted as saying that he knew who the alleged perpetrators were, but declined to identify them and appealed for Palestinian unity. Egypt offered to mediate the situation.

==== Palestinian National Unity Government of March 2007 ====
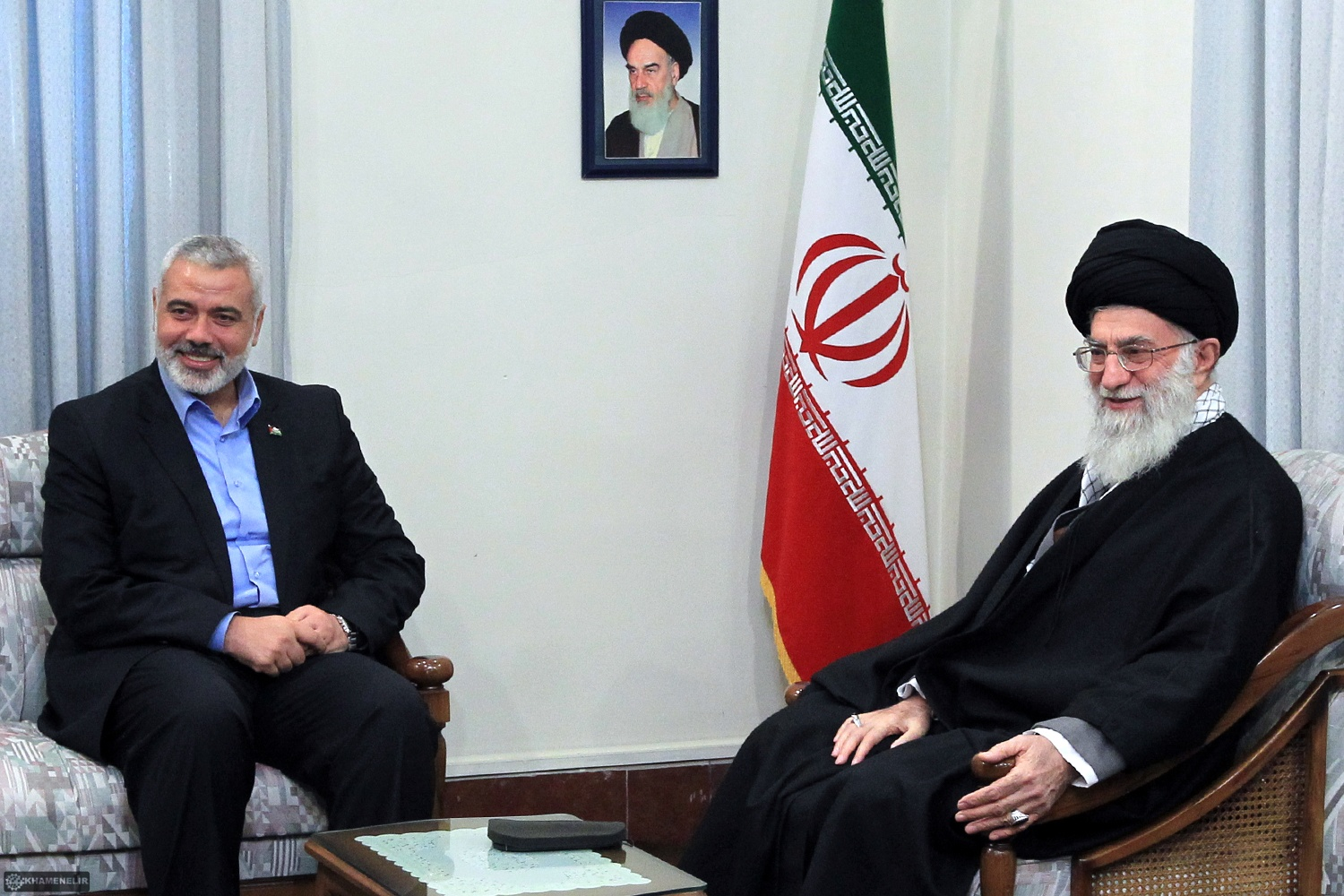
Haniyeh and Iranian Supreme Leader Ali Khamenei in 2012

Haniyeh resigned on 15 February 2007 as part of the process to form a national unity government between Hamas and Fatah. He formed a new government on 18 March 2007 as head of a new cabinet that included Fatah as well as Hamas politicians.

On 14 June 2007, amid the Battle of Gaza, President Mahmoud Abbas announced the dissolution of the March 2007 unity government and the declaration of a state of emergency. Haniyeh was dismissed and Abbas ruled Gaza and the West Bank by presidential decree.

=== After the Battle of Gaza ===
Around 2016, Haniyeh relocated from Gaza to Qatar. He maintained an office in Doha.

On 13 October 2016, the Legal Committee of the Palestinian Legislative Council (PLC) endorsed a request for the return of Haniyeh's government to the Gaza Strip, following its resignation on 2 June 2014. The endorsement was made in response to PLC's review of a study submitted by members of Hamas' parliament, angry about perceived government failings following Haniyeh's resignation. In Hamas' own words, denouncing the consensus government's "reneging on the internal accord between Hamas and factions of the Palestine Liberation Organization to form the 2014 consensus government, and replacing several ministers with Fatah leaders – turning it into a Fatah government." Despite the PLC recommendation and Hamas' plea, both the consensus government and Fatah refused the request, citing in a press release its illegality and risk of further divisions between Hamas-controlled Gaza and the West Bank.

=== Head of Hamas political bureau ===
As of November 2016, reports circulated regarding Haniyeh's succession of Khaled Mashaal as leader of Hamas. Mashaal, Haniyeh and Palestinian President Mahmoud Abbas met in Qatar recently to discuss national reconciliation and the upcoming national elections. This meeting signaled that Haniyeh had been selected over the other two likely candidates, senior Hamas member Mousa Abu Marzook and Hamas co-founder and former Palestinian Authority foreign minister Mahmoud al-Zahar.

In 2017, Hamas changed its core policy, saying it “advocates the liberation of all of Palestine but is ready to support the state on 1967 borders without recognising Israel or ceding any rights.”

In 2018 he was placed on United States' list of specially designated global terrorists.

Haniyeh left Gaza in September to visit a series of Arab and Muslim states in preparation for his new role and officially relocated to the Qatari capital of Doha, where Mashaal has been residing. It is expected of the head of Hamas' politburo to live outside of the Gaza Strip.

In February 2020, Haniyeh met with Turkish President Recep Tayyip Erdoğan; the meeting was criticised by the U.S. State Department.

In August 2020, Haniyeh called Mahmoud Abbas and rejected the normalization agreement between Israel and the United Arab Emirates, something which Reuters called a "rare show of unity".

On 26 July 2023, Haniyeh met with Erdoğan and Palestinian Authority President Mahmoud Abbas. Behind the meeting was Turkey's effort to reconcile Fatah with Hamas.

==== Gaza war ====
On 7 October 2023, the day of the October 7 attacks, Haniyeh was in Istanbul, Turkey. Footage from his office in the Qatari capital of Doha showed Haniyeh celebrating the Hamas-led October 7 attack with other Hamas officials, before they prayed and praised God. According to the Telegraph, Haniyeh became the "public face" of the attack, publicly describing it as the start of a new era in the Israeli-Palestinian conflict. Haniyeh gave a televised address in which he cited threats to Al-Aqsa mosque, the Israeli blockade of Gaza, and plight of Palestinian refugees: "How many times have we warned you that the Palestinian people have been living in refugee camps for 75 years, and you refuse to recognise the rights of our people?" He went on to say that Israel, "which cannot protect itself in the face of resistors", could not provide protection for other Arab countries, and that "all the normalization agreements that you signed with that entity cannot resolve this [Palestinian] conflict."

PCPSR opinion poll on Palestinian presidential election candidates

- Ismail Haniyeh
- Mahmoud Abbas

On 10 October, Haniyeh said Hamas would not consider the release of any Israeli captives until the war was over. He claimed that the scope of Israel's retaliation was a reflection of the "resounding impact" the 7 October attack had on the country, and reiterated that the Palestinian people in Gaza had a "willingness to sacrifice all that is precious for the sake of their freedom and dignity." He added that Israel "will pay a heavy price for their crimes and terrorism [against the people of Palestine]."

On 15 October 2023, The Times of Israel reported that Haniyeh "was politely sent away" from Turkey; Turkey officially denied these reports. Haniyeh later met with Iranian Foreign Minister Hossein Amir-Abdollahian in Doha.

On 16 October 2023, Haniyeh and Turkey's Foreign Minister Hakan Fidan discussed the possibility of releasing the hostages taken during the Hamas attack on Israel. On 21 October 2023, Haniyeh spoke with Turkish President Recep Tayyip Erdoğan about the latest developments in the Gaza war and the current situation in Gaza.

On 13 December, an opinion poll showed that Haniyeh would defeat incumbent Mahmoud Abbas by a landslide for the position of President of the State of Palestine (78% for Haniyeh and 16% for Abbas). However, in a three-way race between Haniyeh, Abbas, and Marwan Barghouti, Barghouti would win 47%, Haniyeh would win 43% and Abbas would win 7%. Barghouti is under solitary imprisonment by Israel.

In April 2024, Haniyeh met with Fatah's deputy head, Mahmoud Aloul, in China to discuss reconciliation. On 23 July, a further round of talks between Hamas and Fatah resulted in an agreement to form an “interim national reconciliation government” to maintain Palestinian control in the Gaza Strip after the war.

At the time of his death, he had been leading cease-fire negotiations for Hamas. President Joe Biden said publicly that Israel's killing of Haniyeh, a key negotiator in the ceasefire talks, "doesn't help" efforts to secure a ceasefire in Gaza.

== Legal case ==
On 20 May 2024, an arrest warrant for Haniyeh, as well as for other Palestinian and Israeli leaders, was requested by the International Criminal Court (ICC) prosecutor Karim Khan as part of the ICC investigation in Palestine, on several counts of war crimes and crimes against humanity during the Gaza war.

== Views ==
Haniyeh was seen as relatively one of the more pragmatic and moderate figures in Hamas.

=== Relations with Israel ===
In March 2002, during the Second Intifada, Haniyeh was quoted as saying, "Jews love life more than any other people, and they prefer not to die," reflecting the view that Palestinian suicide bombings had exposed Israel's greatest vulnerability after years of conflict.

In August 2006, on his first visit abroad as prime minister to Iran, Haniyeh said: "We will never recognize the usurper Zionist government and will continue our jihad-like movement until the liberation of Jerusalem".

In December 2010, Haniyeh stated at a news conference in Gaza, "We accept a Palestinian state on the borders of 1967, with Jerusalem as its capital, the release of Palestinian prisoners, and the resolution of the issue of refugees." In addition, he said that if the Palestinian electorate approves such a peace agreement with Israel, his government will abide by it notwithstanding previous Hamas positions on the issue.

On 23 March 2014, during a festival commemorating the tenth anniversary of the assassination of Sheik Ahmad Yassin, Haniyeh delivered a speech to a crowd of Hamas supporters, saying "From within Gaza, I repeat again and again: We will not recognize Israel... The Gaza blockade is unfortunately getting tighter and tighter." During this speech, the crowd chanted "Move forward Hamas, move! We are the cannon and you are the bullets. ... Oh Qassam, our beloved, bombard Tel Aviv."

On 1 November 2023, Haniyeh accused Israel of committing "barbaric massacres against unarmed civilians" after Israel conducted an attack on the Jabalia refugee camp in an operation targeting senior Hamas member Ibrahim Biari, and resolved that fighting would continue until "Palestinians obtain their 'legitimate rights to freedom, independence and return'".

On 2 November 2023, Haniyeh stated that if Israel agreed to a ceasefire and the opening of humanitarian corridors to bring more aid into Gaza, Hamas would be "ready for political negotiations for a two-state solution with Jerusalem as the capital of Palestine," adding that "Israeli captives are subjected to the same destruction and death as our people."

=== Pope Benedict XVI Islam controversy ===
During the Pope Benedict XVI Islam controversy in 2006, Haniyeh strongly objected to the Pope's remarks: "In the name of the Palestinian people, we condemn the Pope's remarks on Islam. These remarks go against the truth and touch the heart of our faith." Haniyeh also denounced the Muslim attacks on churches in the West Bank and Gaza that occurred in reaction to the controversy.

=== Osama bin Laden ===
On 2 May 2011, Osama bin Laden was killed by U.S. forces in Pakistan, and the killing was praised by Hamas's rival Fatah. Haniyeh instead referred to bin Laden as an "Arab holy warrior" and condemned his killing as "the continuation of the American oppression and shedding of blood of Muslims and Arabs". Political analysts said the remarks were an attempt to cool differences in the Gaza Strip with Al-Qaeda-inspired Salafi groups, which condemn Hamas as too moderate. Another analyst wrote that Haniyeh's statement was directed at an Arab audience, and he saw an opportunity to distinguish Hamas from Fatah and exploit anti-American sentiment. The United States government condemned his remarks as "outrageous".

== Personal and family life ==
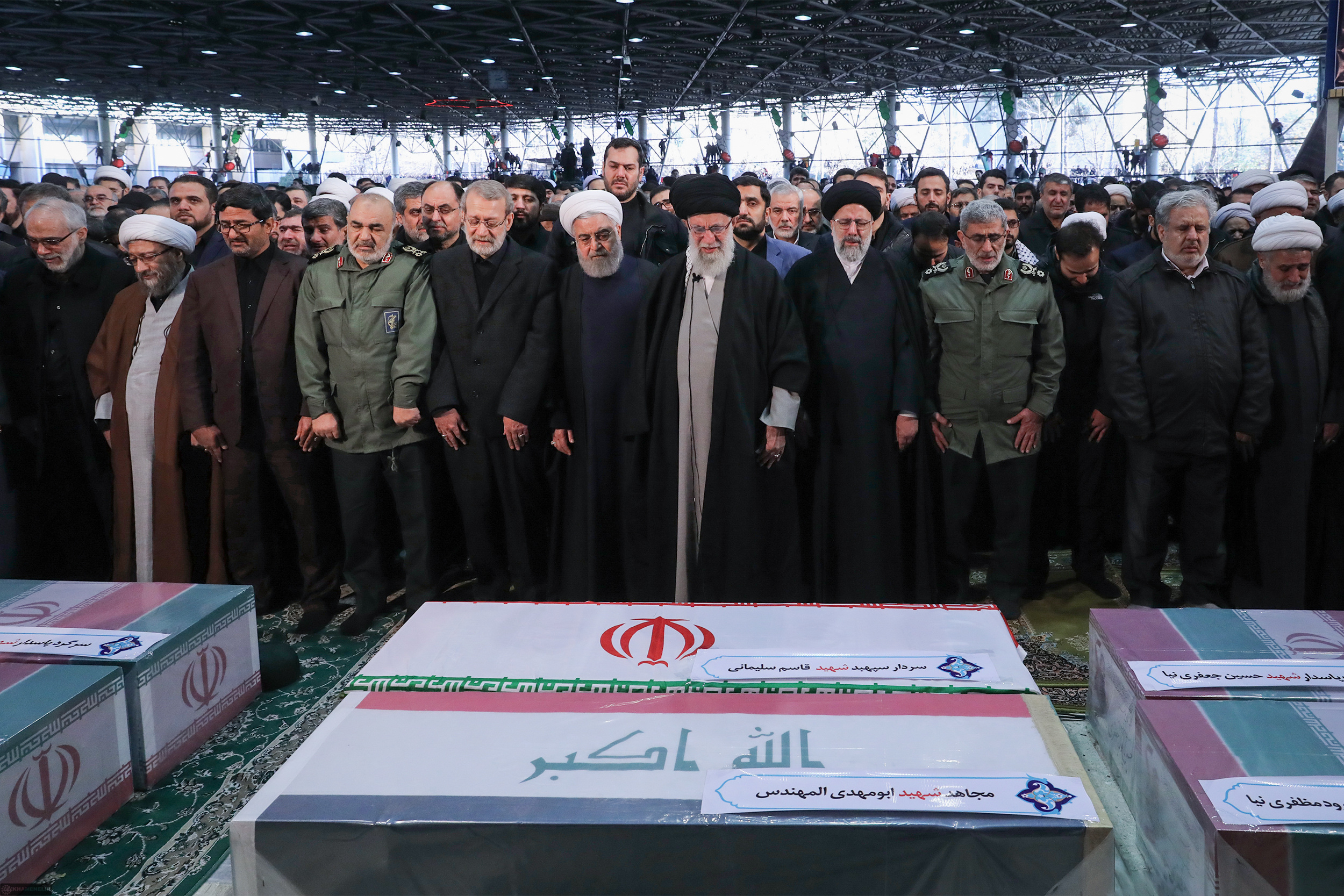
Haniyeh standing behind Khamenei during the funeral of Qasem Soleimani.

Haniyeh was married and had 13 children, three of whom were killed in 2024. In 2009, the family lived in Al-Shati refugee camp in the northern Gaza Strip. In 2010, Haniyeh purchased a 2,500-square-metre (0.6-acre) parcel of land in Rimal, a Gaza City beachfront neighborhood. Haniyeh registered the land in the name of his son-in-law. Subsequently, Haniyeh reportedly purchased additional homes and registered them under the names of his children. According to a 2014 Ynet article, Haniyeh was a millionaire, stemming from the 20% tax charged on all items entering through tunnels from Egypt to the Gaza Strip. Haniyeh's eldest son was arrested by Egyptian authorities at the Rafah Border Crossing with several million dollars, which he intended to take into Gaza.

Haniyeh's sisters, Kholidia, Laila, and Sabah, are Israeli citizens and live in the Bedouin town of Tel as-Sabi in southern Israel. Kholodia moved to Tel as-Sabi first and then her two sisters followed. Kholidia's husband said, "Our life is normal here and we want it to continue." Laila and Sabah are both widowed but remain in Tel as-Sabi, presumably to retain their Israeli citizenship. Some of the children of the three sisters have served in the Israel Defense Forces (IDF), according to The Daily Telegraph.

In early 2012, Israeli authorities granted a request to travel by Haniyeh's sister, Suhila Abd el‑Salam Ahmed Haniyeh, and her critically ill husband for emergency heart treatment that could not be treated by hospitals in Gaza. After successful treatment at the Rabin Medical Center in Petah Tikva, Israel, the couple returned to Gaza. Haniyeh's granddaughter was treated in an Israeli hospital in November 2013 and his mother-in-law was treated in an Israeli hospital in June 2014. In October 2014, a few months after the 2014 Israel–Gaza War, Haniyeh's daughter spent a week in an Israeli hospital in Tel Aviv for emergency treatment after she suffered complications from a routine procedure.

In September 2016, Haniyeh left Gaza with his wife and two of his sons for the annual pilgrimage to Mecca, known as the Hajj. This trip, interpreted as a campaign commencement, bolstered reports that Haniyeh was to replace Mashaal. He went to Qassim Suleimani's funeral, in Tehran, Iran in 2020.

During the last few years of his life, Haniyeh lived in Qatar.

=== Targeting of family members by Israel ===
More than sixty members of his extended family have been killed by Israel.

In October 2023, fourteen members of his family were killed in an Israeli airstrike on his family home in Gaza City, among them a brother and nephew.

In November 2023, his granddaughter Roaa Haniyeh was reportedly killed in an Israeli airstrike in Gaza City. Later that month his eldest grandson was killed in an Israeli strike.

On 10 April 2024, three of his sons—Hazem, Amir, and Muhammad— and four of his grandchildren were killed during an Israeli airstrike on their family car in the Gaza Strip. The three sons and three of the grandchildren died that day. The New Arab reported that a fifth granddaughter, named Malak, who had also been in the car, died of her injuries a week later. The BBC named the four grandchildren as Mona, Amal, Khaled, and Razan. Israel claimed Haniyeh's sons were "Hamas operatives" and were "on their way to carry out terrorist activities". According to Haniyeh's relatives, the family members had been traveling together to Eid al-Fitr celebrations. Middle East Eye released a video filmed on a mobile phone that allegedly shows one of Haniyeh's granddaughters "moments before fatal Israeli strike", excited about the festivities and yelling, "Eid has come".

On 25 June 2024, ten members of his family, including his 80-year-old sister Zahr Abdel Salam Haniyeh, were killed in an Israeli airstrike in al-Shati refugee camp. The nine other family members killed were Nahed Haniyeh Abu Ghazi, Iman Haniyeh Umm Ghazi, Ismail Nahed Haniyeh, Muhammad Nahed Haniyeh, Moamen Nahed Haniyeh, Zahra Nahed Haniyeh, Amal Nahed Haniyeh, Shahad Nahed Haniyeh, and Sumaya Nahed Haniyeh.

== Assassination ==
On 31 July 2024, Haniyeh was assassinated in Tehran, where he was attending the inauguration of newly elected President of Iran Masoud Pezeshkian. Hamas said that he was killed, along with one of his bodyguards, by a "Zionist" airstrike on a residence. He was 62 at the time. According to The New York Times and other sources, Haniyeh was assassinated using a remotely detonated explosive device hidden in his guesthouse room two months earlier, which was triggered once he was confirmed to be inside. The Islamic Revolutionary Guard Corps of Iran said that Haniyeh was killed by "a short-range projectile carrying about 7kg [15.4lb] of explosive materials" that was launched from outside the building he was staying in.

A funeral was held for Haniyeh in Tehran on 1 August, with Iran's supreme leader Ali Khamenei leading prayers. Haniyeh's remains were then taken to Qatar and buried in Lusail the following day.

== Writings ==
- "Hamas: An Analysis of the Vision and Experience in Power" (book chapter) in Dr. Mohsen M. Saleh (editor), The Islamic Resistance Movement (Hamas): Studies of Thoughts & Experience, Al-Zaytouna Centre, 2017, pp. 469–483.

Opinion pieces in The Guardian by Ismail Haniyeh

- Ismail Haniyeh – the new Palestinian prime minister and a Hamas leader (30 March 2006). "A just peace or no peace". The Guardian.
- Ismail Haniyeh – the Palestinian prime minister (5 June 2007). "1967: Our rights have to be recognised". The Guardian.

== Notes ==
Political offices
Preceded by Ahmed Qurei	Prime Minister of the Palestinian National Authority; 2006–2014 (in dissidence in the Gaza Strip only from 14 June 2007)	Succeeded by Rami Hamdallah
Preceded by Sakhr Bseiso	Minister of Youth and Sports; 2006–2007	Succeeded by Basem Naim
