= Abbas Government =

Palestinian cabinet

- Date formed: 30 April 2003
- Date dissolved: 7 October 2003

People and organisations
- Head of state: Yasser Arafat
- Head of government: Mahmoud Abbas (until 6 September); Vacant (starting 6 September)

History
- Predecessor: Fifth Arafat Government
- Successor: First Qurei Government

The Palestinian Authority Government of April 2003 was a government of the Palestinian National Authority (PA) from 30 April to 7 October 2003. It was headed by Mahmoud Abbas, the first PA Prime Minister, until 6 September 2003. The Prime Minister and his government were approved by the Palestinian Legislative Council on 29 April and were sworn in on 30 April.

Abbas resigned as Prime Minister on 6 September 2003 because of a struggle for power with President Yasser Arafat and the stagnated implementation of the road map for peace.

After the discharge of the Government in September 2003, Speaker of the Palestinian Legislative Council Ahmed Qurei was asked to become Prime Minister of an emergency government, but Arafat, on 5 October, appointed Qurei PM of a small emergency cabinet before a government could be presented to Parliament. Qurei and his cabinet were sworn in on 7 October 2003.

== History ==
Formerly, the government was chosen and appointed by PA President Arafat, and Arafat also presided the "Council of Ministers". Under strong pressure of the international community and Israel, Arafat, held hostage in his largely destroyed headquarters in Ramallah besieged by the Israeli army since September 2002, changed the political system. On 18 March 2003, he signed the 2003 Amended Basic Law, which transformed the political system into a semi-presidential one. The Prime Minister became responsible for the composition of the Cabinet and became the Chairman of the "Council of Ministers".

On 19 March, Mahmoud Abbas accepted the post of Prime Minister. Arafat accepted Abbas' new government on 24 April, and on 29 April Abbas and his Cabinet were approved by the Parliament. The change came after strong pressure by the Middle East Quartet, who wanted to push its Roadmap for peace and supported Abbas. The day after the inauguration of the Government, on 30 April 2003, the Quartet published its Roadmap for peace.

The Abbas Government was not long-lived. Abbas already resigned as Prime Minister on 6 September 2003, because of a struggle for power with Yasser Arafat and the stagnated implementation of the Road map for Peace by Israel.

== Members of the Government ==
1. Mahmoud Abbas (Abu Mazen): Prime Minister and Interior Minister -Fatah

2. Yasser Abed Rabbo: Minister of Cabinet Affairs - [FIDA]/former DFLP

3. Muhammad Dahlan: Minister of State for Security Affairs -Fatah

4. Saeb Erekat: Minister of State for Negotiations Affairs -Fatah

5. Nabil Shaath: Foreign Affairs -Fatah

6. Salam Fayyad: Finance - [Technocrat - Independent]

7. Abdul Karim Abu Salah: Justice - Fatah/[Independent]

8. Maher al Masri: Economy, Trade & Rations -Fatah

9. Nabil Kassis: Planning - [Independent]

10.Nabil Amr: Information -Fatah

11. Rafiq al Natsheh: Agriculture -Fatah

12. Kamal Sharafi: Health - [former PFLP]

13. Naim Abu Al Hummus: Education -Fatah

14. Mitri Abu 'Aita: Tourism & Antiquities - [Independent]

15. Ghassan Khatib: Labor - [Palestinian People's Party, PPP]

16. Azam al-Shawa: Energy & Natural Resources

17. Jamal Shobaki: Local Governance -Fatah

18. Ziad Abu Amr: Culture - [independent]

19. Hamdan Ashour: Housing and Public Works -Fatah

20. Azzam al-Ahmad: Telecommunication and Information Technology -Fatah

21. Saedi al-Krunz: Transportation -Fatah

22. Intisar al Wazir (Um Jihad): Social Affairs -Fatah

23. Hisham Abdul Razeq: Prisoners' Affairs -Fatah

24. Abdul Fatah Hamayel: Minister of State without portfolio -Fatah

Vacant Ministries:

1. Islamic Waqf (Trust)

2. Sports and Youths

3. Jerusalem

== See also ==
- Palestinian government
