= First Qurei Government =

Palestinian cabinet

Palestinian Authority Government of October 2003
- Date formed: 7 October 2003
- Date dissolved: 12 November 2003

People and organisations
- Head of state: Yasser Arafat
- Head of government: Ahmed Qurei
- No. of ministers: 8
- Member party: Independent
- Status in legislature: Fatah-dominated PLC refused to hold a vote of confidence before the formation of the full Cabinet

History
- Predecessor: Palestinian Authority Government of April 2003
- Successor: Palestinian Authority Government of November 2003

The Palestinian Authority Government of October 2003 was an eight-member Palestinian Authority (PA) emergency government that was formed on 7 October and existed until 12 November 2003. It was headed by newly appointed Prime Minister Ahmed Qurei and established by presidential decree.

On 12 November 2003, the Cabinet was replaced by a 24-member government, also headed by Qurei.

== Establishment ==
On 6 September 2003, Mahmoud Abbas resigned as Prime Minister and Ahmed Qurei was asked to become PM of an emergency government. Following a suicide bombing in Haifa on 4 October, Israel threatened to "remove" Arafat and urged him to act within 48 hours. The next day, Arafat created a new government by decree, before Qurei had accomplished his task to form a government. Initially, Qurei had planned to present a larger government to parliament for approval later in the week.

The emergency government was to serve for a month, with a possible one-month extension, unless Qurei could present a full-sized Cabinet to Parliament within a month. The Fatah Central Committee agreed to the emergency Cabinet, but the Fatah-dominated Palestinian Legislative Council refused to hold a vote of confidence before the formation of the full Cabinet.

In his decree, Arafat had named Nasser Yousef to become the Interior Minister of a nine-member cabinet. However, Yousef was not sworn in. Palestinian sources said Yousef had refused to join the government because he was unhappy Arafat had appointed an emergency Cabinet instead of going through the normal channels. Other sources said he would be sworn in soon. On 12 November 2003, however, Hakam Balawi was appointed Interior Minister in the next government. After Arafat's death, Nasser Yousef became at last Minister of Interior and National Security in the Palestinian Authority Government of February 2005.

== Members of the Government ==
October to November 2003

	Minister	Office	Party
1	Ahmed Qurei (Abu Ala)	Prime Minister, acting Waqf and Information Minister	Fatah
2	Salam Fayyad	Finance, acting Economy and Planning, Agriculture, Energy and Natural Resources Minister	Independent
3	Nabil Shaath	Foreign Affairs, acting Culture Minister	Fatah
4	Naim Abu Al Hummus	Education, acting Labor Minister	Fatah
5	Saeb Erekat	acting Justice and Tourism Minister	Fatah
6	Abdul Rahman Hamad	Housing and Public Works, acting Transportation, Telecommunication and Technology	Fatah
7	Jamal Shobaki	Local Governance, acting Prisoners' Affairs and Sports and Youth Minister	Fatah
8	Jawad Tibi	Health, acting Social Affairs Minister	Fatah
Note: * Nasser Yousef was named Interior Minister, but not sworn in.

== See also ==
- Palestinian government
