= Palestinian suicide attacks =

Suicide bombings by Palestinian groups in the Israeli–Palestinian conflict

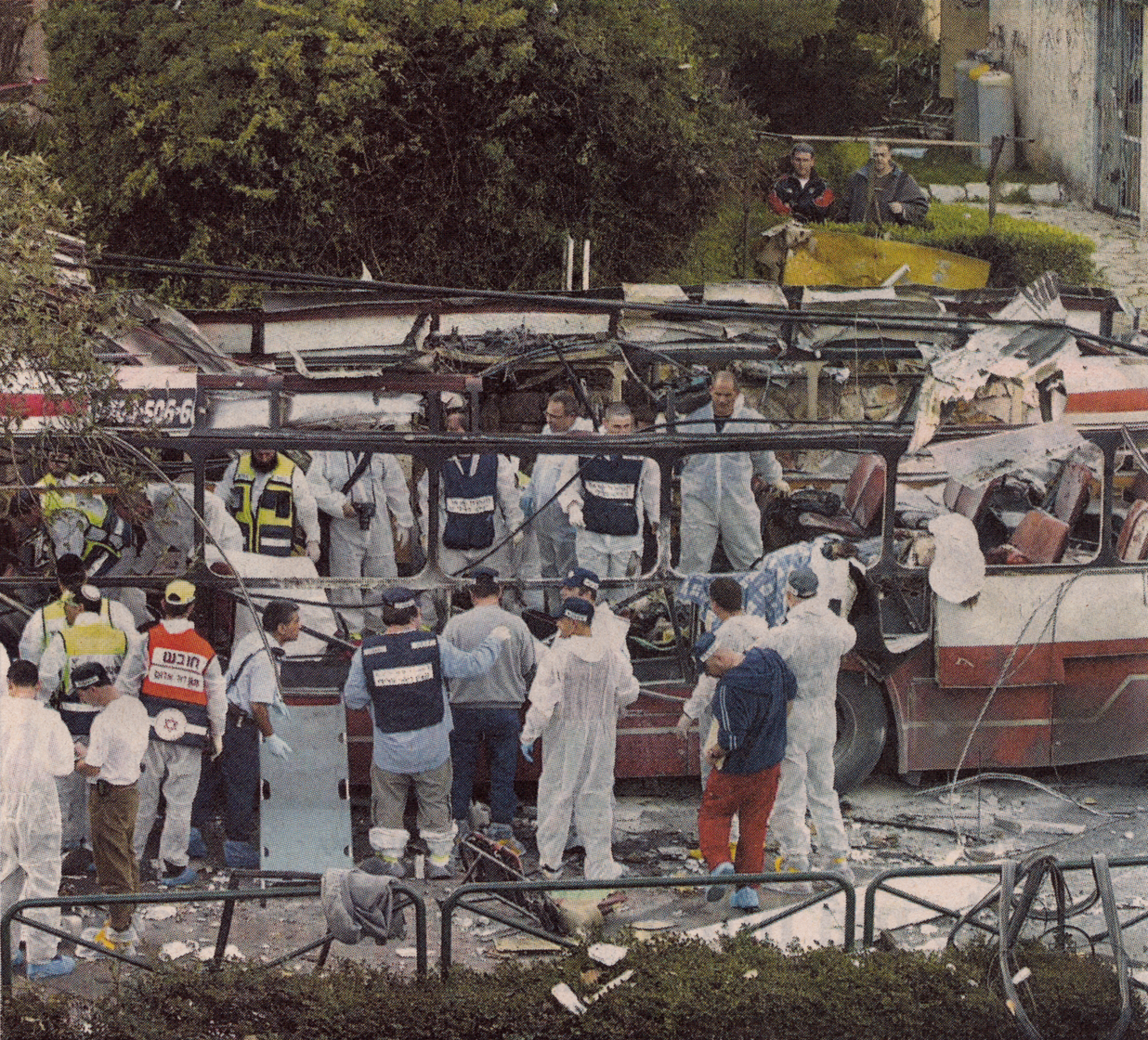
Aftermath of the 2003 Haifa bus 37 suicide bombing perpetrated by Hamas.

Palestinian groups have used suicide bombings in the Israeli–Palestinian conflict, predominantly targeting Israeli civilians. This tactic is also referred to as suicide terrorism. It emerged in the 1990s and reached its peak during the Second Intifada (2000–2005). Attacks occurred at various locations, including shopping centers, public buses, transit stations, cafes, nightclubs, and restaurants, According to a 2006 study from the University of Haifa, only a few of the bombings targeted military objectives. Between 1994 and 2005, suicide bombings killed 735 Israelis and wounded 4,554.

The majority of Palestinian suicide bombings targeting Israelis have been carried out by radical Palestinian groups, who often recruit potential bombers from outside their ranks, rather than relying on internal members. In the early 1990s, Islamist organizations such as Hamas and the Palestinian Islamic Jihad (PIJ) adopted this strategy in response to the Oslo Accords, which had elevated the PLO's more secular position and sidelined these Islamist groups. During the Second Intifada, suicide attacks against Israel intensified and gained widespread Palestinian support, leading to the development of a martyrdom cult. This led to its adoption by other groups such as the Al-Aqsa Martyrs' Brigades and Fatah's Tanzim, which sought to leverage the tactic to enhance their own standing.

Within Palestinian militant organizations, such as Hamas and Palestinian Islamic Jihad, suicide bombings are officially designated as "martyrdom operations". For many Palestinian suicide bombers, martyrdom represents a fulfillment of religious duty, driven by an Islamist interpretation of Jihad that equates martyrdom with a sacred obligation. This perspective, combined with an animosity toward Jews and a response to perceived national humiliation and injustice associated with the 1948 displacement and the Israeli occupation, renders martyrdom a compelling choice. Bombers are also motivated by a desire for revenge, personal pride and honor, and the promise of spiritual and material rewards in the afterlife. Public support for suicide bombers is reflected in cultural practices such as mass funerals, the naming of public spaces after bombers, and promotion through social media, written media, education, and children's programs.

Suicide bombings in the 1990s and 2000s had an unexpected and severe impact on Israel's home front, profoundly affecting Israeli society and hardening attitudes towards Palestinians as potential peace partners in a two-state solution. The bombings contributed to Israeli prime minister Ariel Sharon's decision to construct the West Bank barrier inside and around the West Bank.

== Background ==
In the 1980s there were high-profile incidents of suicide terrorism in Lebanon, and since then the tactic has become widespread globally. The first suicide attack by an Islamist group occurred in the 1981 Iraqi Embassy in Beirut by the Islamic Dawa Party, followed by Hezbollah's 1983 Beirut barracks bombings. This tactic has since been employed in countries such as India, Indonesia, Iran, Iraq, Israel, Kenya, Lebanon, Pakistan, Palestine, Russia, Saudi Arabia, Sri Lanka, Turkey, the UK, the US, and Yemen. Hezbollah's attacks specifically influenced Palestinian groups such as Hamas and the Palestinian Islamic Jihad (PIJ), leading them to adopt similar procedures for selecting and training suicide bombers.

Between 1994 and 2005, suicide bombings killed 735 Israelis and wounded 4,554.

Palestinian militants refer to suicide bombings as "martyrdom operations" (Arabic: عمليات استشهادية, romanized: 'amaliyyāt istišhādiyya). This term is used by both the more recently formed Islamic nationalist groups (such as Hamas and Palestinian Islamic Jihad), as well as the militant wings of some Palestine Liberation Organization factions (such as the Al-Aqsa Martyrs' Brigades and the PFLP).

== Perpetrators ==
The majority of suicide bombings targeting Israelis have been organized by Palestinian nationalist groups, initially led by Islamist organizations and then adopted by more secular groups. These organizations typically recruit bombers from outside their own ranks, rather than relying on internal members. Suicide bombs were later used by a smaller number of Palestinians in anti-nationalist groups.

=== The Islamic Resistance Movement (Hamas) ===
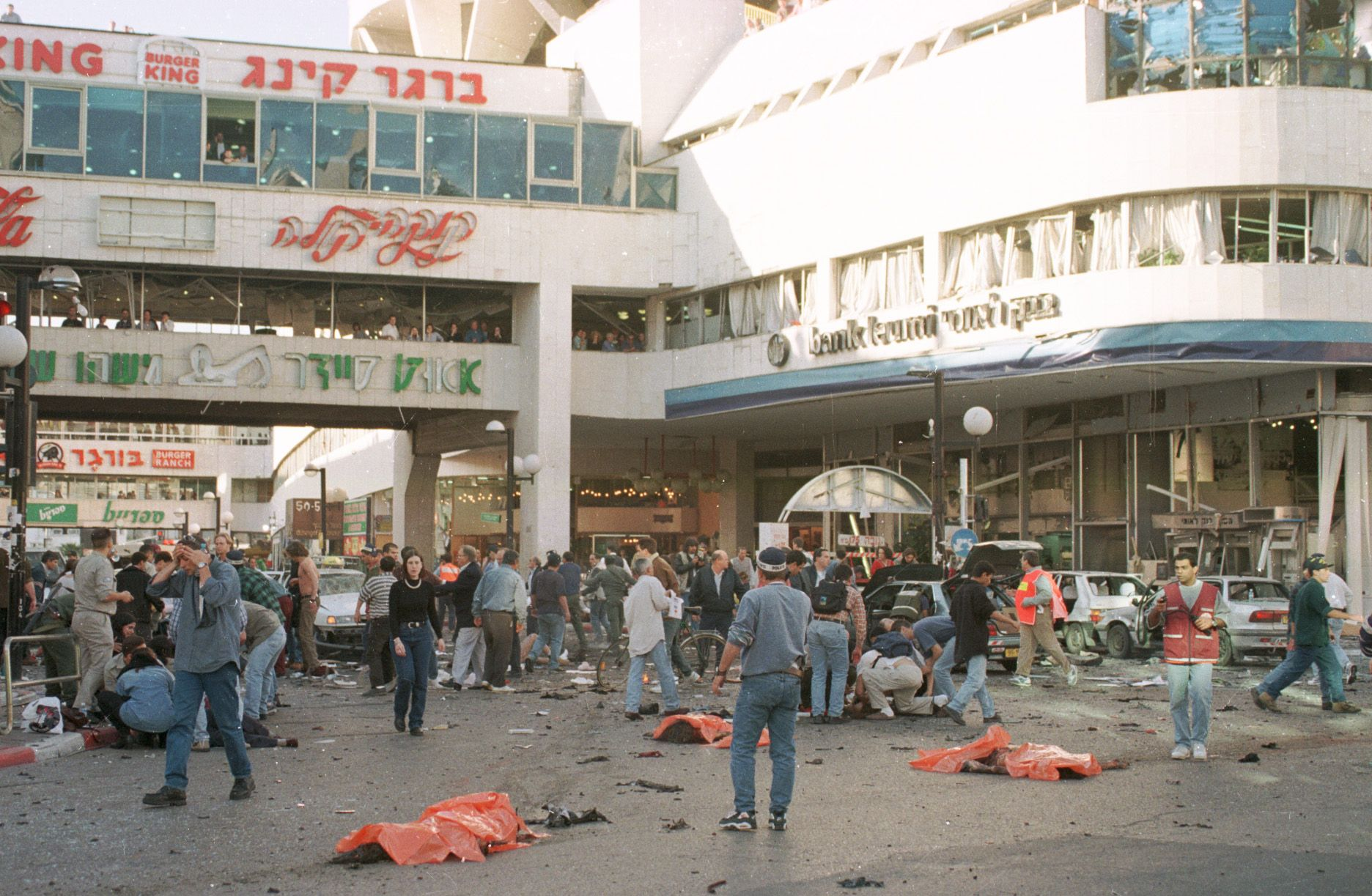
Aftermath of the Dizengoff Center suicide bombing, carried out by Hamas in downtown Tel Aviv in March 1996, killing 13 Israelis.

Hamas, through its military wing Al-Qassam Brigades, has been responsible for numerous suicide attacks since 1993. The group has conducted more suicide attacks and caused more Israeli casualties than any other Palestinian group.

Hamas presents both practical and doctrinal justifications for suicide bombings. Practically, they emphasize the harm and deterrence these attacks inflict on Israeli society. Doctrinally, they glorify martyrdom as the pinnacle of jihad and Islamic belief. The old 1988 Hamas Covenant (revised in 2017) articulated the group's goal, stating, "Israel will exist and will continue to exist until Islam will obliterate it, just as it obliterated others before it". Additionally, Article 7 of the 1988 Covenant declares, "The time [of Redemption] will not come until the Muslims fight the Jews and kill them, and until the Jews hide behind rocks and trees when the call is raised: 'Oh Muslim, here is a Jew hiding! Come and kill him.'" The group contends that suicide bombings establish a "balance of fear" (tawazun ra'b) against Israel by inflicting significant casualties and psychological distress on Israelis, despite the group's own military limitations. Additionally, Hamas frames these attacks as a testament to "Palestinian innovative genius" (abqariyyat al-ibda' al-filastini), showcasing their perceived creativity and strategic ingenuity in the ongoing conflict.

The first major attack by Hamas occurred on April 13, 1994, at the Hadera bus station suicide bombing, killing five people, as retribution for the Cave of the Patriarchs massacre by Baruch Goldstein in February. A significant escalation in Hamas' suicide bombing campaign followed the assassination of bombmaker Yahya Ayyash in January 1996. This led to a surge in attacks until late 1997. During the initial 21 months of the Second Intifada (September 2000 to June 2002), Hamas was responsible for approximately 43% of all suicide attacks against Israelis, killing 161 and injuring over 1,100. Ganor writes that from 2000 to 2005, Hamas orchestrated 92 out of 155 total terrorist attacks. Moghadam notes that Hamas has demonstrated a high level of lethality and effectiveness in its attacks, often causing more casualties than other Palestinian groups.

=== Palestinian Islamic Jihad ===
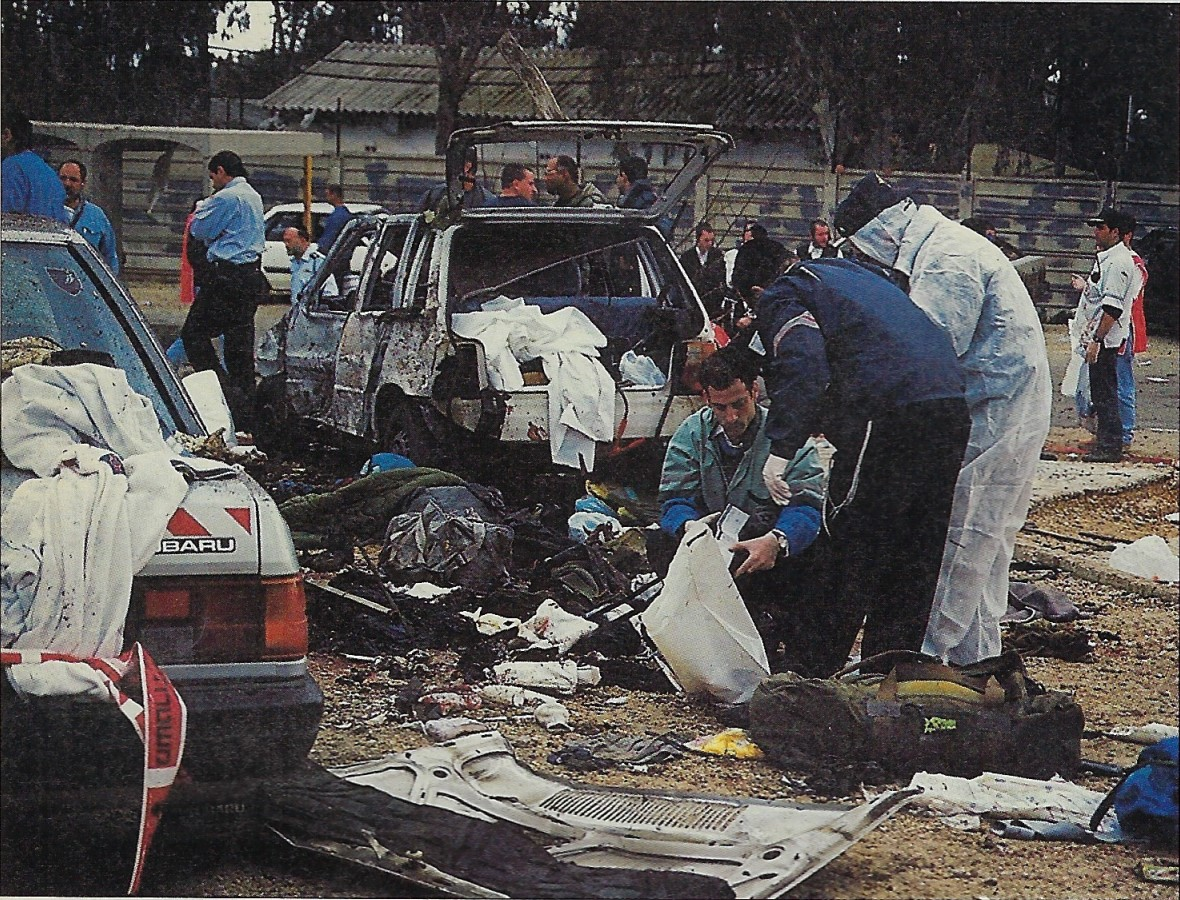
Aftermath of the dual bombings at Beit Lid junction, carried out by the PIJ in January 1995, killing 20 soldiers and 1 civilian.

The Palestinian Islamic Jihad (PIJ) was behind the 1989 Tel Aviv–Jerusalem bus attack, which killed 16 civilians, and is considered by some as the first Palestinian suicide attack in Israel.

The PIJ began conducting suicide bombings between 1994 and 1997. The group's attacks primarily targeted civilians within Israel proper, including Jerusalem. The PIJ's first notable suicide bombing was on November 11, 1994, when a PIJ member used a bicycle bomb to kill three Israelis. On January 22, 1995, PIJ carried out one of the deadliest attacks in Israeli history with dual bombings at Beit Lid junction, resulting in the deaths 20 Israeli soldiers and 1 civilian. During the initial 21 months of the Second Intifada (September 2000 to June 2002), PIJ was responsible for approximately 20% of all suicide attacks, killing at least 28 Israelis and injuring 213. The number of attacks by PIJ increased over time, peaking with the Megiddo Junction bus bombing in June 2002, which killed 17 Israelis.

The Ideology of the PIJ was influenced by Islamist thinker Sayyid Qutb. Fathi Shiqaqi, a co-founder of PIJ, has advocated the idea that jihad is a personal duty. Former PIJ leader Ramadan Shalah expressed the group's reliance on martyrdom as a tactic, stating, "We have nothing with which to repel the killing and thuggery against us except the weapon of martyrdom. It is easy and costs us only our lives [...] human bombs cannot be defeated, not even by nuclear bombs".

=== Fatah, Tanzim, and Al-Aqsa Martyrs Brigades ===
During the Second Intifada, Fatah, the primary faction of the Palestine Liberation Organization (PLO) led then by Yasser Arafat, was a major player in the use of suicide terrorism. During the initial 21 months of the Second Intifada (September 2000 to June 2002), Fatah has been responsible for nearly a third of all suicide attacks and became the most active organization in terms of the number of attacks on Israelis. The group's strategy involved leveraging the Tanzim and the Al-Aqsa Martyrs Brigades to provide a secular alternative to Islamist groups like Hamas and PIJ.

The Tanzim, the armed wing of Fatah, was involved in significant violence, particularly following Ariel Sharon's visit to the Temple Mount. The Tanzim's first major suicide attack occurred on January 17, 2002, in Hadera, killed six people and wounded 33 at a bat mitzvah children celebration.

The Al-Aqsa Martyrs Brigades, a faction within Fatah formed after September 2000, emerged during the Second Intifada as a leading group in carrying out suicide attacks. In the early months of 2002, this group was responsible for over half of all suicide attacks, prompting the U.S. State Department to designate it as a Foreign Terrorist Organization in March 2002. The Al-Aqsa Martyrs Brigades are closely linked to Fatah, with many of its members also being part of the Palestinian Authority's security forces.

=== Popular Front for the Liberation of Palestine (PFLP) ===
The Popular Front for the Liberation of Palestine (PFLP), a secular Marxist–Leninist faction originating from the PLO, carried out a limited number of suicide attacks during the Second Intifada. Under George Habash's leadership, the PFLP's rejection of suicide attacks led to a decline in support. However, after shifting to suicide terrorism and adopting jihadist rhetoric in 2001, the group's support levels quickly recovered. Under the leadership of Secretary General Ahmad Sa'adat (2001 to present), the PFLP were responsible for several notable incidents, including the assassination of Israeli Minister of Tourism Rehavam Ze'evi. On February 16, 2002, the PFLP executed a suicide bombing at a mall in Karnei Shomron, resulting in 2 Israeli deaths and 29 injuries. Approximately three weeks later, the PFLP conducted another suicide attack in the settlement of Ariel, injuring 15 people.

=== Jund Ansar Allah (Islamic Emirate of Rafah) ===
Another group in Palestine who have allegedly used suicide bombs were Jund Ansar Allah, an anti-nationalist Islamist group in the Hamas-dominated Gaza Strip. Jund Ansar Allah attacked Israel and were destroyed by forces in 2009, in unconnected incidents. Both Israel and Hamas claim that militants from the group used suicide vests/belts, or horses loaded with explosives.

The IDF claimed that members of Jund Ansar Allah who attempted to attack Karni crossing had been wearing explosive belts, but they were shot dead before detonating them. On 8 June 2009 the group carried out a raid on the Karni border crossing between the Gaza Strip and Israel. Ten people from the group rode into battle on horses laden with large quantities of explosives. Five Jund Ansar Allah were killed during the attack, but at least those were shot dead by Israeli troops. Israeli officials said several of the men had been wearing explosive belts, and suspected they had been attempting to kidnap a soldier.

On 14 August 2009, the leader of Jund Ansar Allah, Abdel Latif Moussa, unexpectedly declared the creation of the Islamic emirate in the Gaza Strip to his armed followers at the Ibn Taymiyya mosque in Rafah after the Friday prayer. During his sermon, Moussa condemned the Palestinian nationalist Islamic Resistance Movement (Hamas) for failing to implement proper Sharia law and "not being any different from a secular government". On the same day, Hamas' Qassam Brigades attacked the Ibn Taymiyya mosque in Rafah and other Jund Ansar Allah bases in Rafah, including the leader's house. The BBC and The Jerusalem Post reported that according to Hamas, when they reached the positions of Moussa and Abu Abdullah al Suri, the two men detonated explosive vests. Jund Ansar Allah was virtually destroyed after the fighting, having both of its leaders killed, and its bases captured.

=== ISIS suicide bombings in the Gaza Strip ===
In 2017 and 2019, during the Sinai insurgency, there were suicide bombings in the Gaza Strip by local ISIS sympathizers. ISIS are a global extremist group, with an ideology that fundamentally opposes the Palestinian nationalism of Hamas and the other groups above. In 2017 two Hamas government border guards were killed while attempting to intercept an ISIS suicide bomber at Rafah Crossing. The Hamas government responded to that bombing with a crackdown on followers of "deviant ideologies" (meaning ISIS and similar groups).

In 2018, members of ISIS in the Sinai "declared war" on Hamas, demanding Hamas release ISIS militants held in Gaza's prisons. Then in 2019, another suicide attack – also attributed to ISIS – directly targeted Gaza Strip police. Three police officers were killed, all three victims were allegedly members of Hamas. Gaza's Security forces responded by arresting ten people whom they suspected were members of the cell who arranged the attack.

== Individual motives ==
Martyrdom among Palestinian suicide bombers is often driven by a combination of religious beliefs, nationalistic sentiment, and personal incentives. Individual motivations for becoming a suicide bomber may stem from various factors, including the desire to attain expected rewards in the afterlife, economic or social benefits for family members, the influence of a widespread culture of martyrdom, the struggle for national liberation, a drive to seek revenge for the death or injury of a loved one, or a response to the real or perceived humiliation associated with Israeli occupation. The involvement of secular groups like Fatah in organizing suicide attacks indicates that religious fervor is not the sole determinant.

=== Religious motives ===
Some scholars argue that religious motives play a significant role among Palestinian suicide bombers, particularly in the recruitment practices of groups like Hamas and PIJ, which seek deeply religious individuals. According to Israeli academic Assaf Moghadam, the Islamist interpretation of Jihad is central to this motivation, which encompasses Jihad al-nafs (the internal struggle for self-control) and Jihad bi al-saif (armed struggle or "holy war"). Islamist groups dismiss the former as heretical and emphasize the latter as the true "Greater Jihad," supporting their view with Quranic verses that equate warfare with religious duty. Moghadam says they use the term shaheed (martyr) for suicide attackers to distinguish these acts from ordinary suicide, which is forbidden in Islam, and that the term derives from shaheda, meaning "to witness," and refers to those who die bearing witness to their faith. He adds that Hamas in particular sees martyrdom as a crucial part of Palestinian identity and mobilization, portraying it as the ultimate act of jihad and devotion to Islam. Israeli academic Ami Pedahzur argues that Hamas and PIJ maintain that jihad in Palestine is a personal duty (fard ayn), rather than a communal obligation (fard kifaya). Other scholars have noted that the term shaheed is not limited to individuals involved in suicide operations, but is instead widely applied to any Palestinian whose life is cut short by the Israeli occupation, regardless of whether they engaged in violent resistance.

According to Moghadam, Islamist groups often frame violence, including suicide bombings, as a defensive Jihad against perceived threats from Israel and the West. He argues that this rhetoric has escalated to calls for violence against Jews more broadly. He notes that during the Second Intifada, Sheikh Ibrahim Madhi, in a sermon at the Sheikh Ijlin Mosque in Gaza, declared that the Jews are "the greatest enemies of the Islamic nation" and that "nothing will deter them except for us voluntarily detonating ourselves in their midst". Moghadam has also said that "a deep-seated animosity toward Jews seems likely to serve as an additional incentive to commit acts of suicide terrorism". He further states that since the early 1990s, and particularly with the onset of the Second Intifada, martyrdom has become increasingly glorified among Palestinians, driven by a tradition in Islam and amplified by Islamist leaders. This glorification has, he says, encouraged Palestinians to undertake "martyrdom operations" against Israelis, depicted as acts of bravery in contrast to the perceived cowardice of Westerners, including Israelis, who are seen as reluctant to sacrifice their lives. According to Moghadam this belief is echoed in statements by figures like the mufti of Jerusalem, Ekrima Sa'id Sabri, and Hamas leader Ismail Haniyeh, who have contrasted the Muslim willingness to die with the Jewish preference for life. He says that martyrdom brings elevated status in Palestinian society, where honor and dignity are highly valued, reinforced by a cult of martyrdom, with martyrs celebrated through posters, leaflets, and large rallies, and for many young Palestinians this glorification offers a path to significant social status and recognition.

Other scholars have challenged the notion that religion is a primary motivator for Palestinian suicide bombings, instead emphasizing political, nationalistic, and socio-cultural factors. Bassam Yousef Ibrahim Banat, Professor of Applied Sociology and an active researcher on Palestinian issues, argues that Palestinian suicide bombers (istishhadiyin) were not religious extremists but ordinary individuals with stable psychological profiles, motivated primarily by nationalistic goals and a response to the daily repression of Israeli occupation. His research concludes that their actions stem from a desire to defend their homeland and people, not religious fervor. Similarly, sociologists Robert Brym and Bader Araj contend that suicide bombings during the Second Intifada were largely strategic reactions to heightened Israeli state repression. They argue that increased violence and limitations on nonviolent protest led secular nationalist groups like Fatah to adopt suicide tactics, not out of religious competition, but as a tactical shift within a broader conflict over territorial control.

Political scientist Robert Pape has found that the vast majority of suicide attacks since the 1980s have been motivated by strategic and political objectives, primarily to end foreign military occupation, rather than by religious or ideological factors. Pape conducted a study of over 2,200 suicide attacks over a 30-year period and found that 95% were not driven by religious rewards but were instead responses to foreign occupation. According to the study, 90% of the attacks were anti-American and occurred in regions under U.S. military occupation. The study also noted a significant decline in suicide bombings in Israel following its withdrawal from Gaza and parts of the West Bank. Pape concluded that suicide bombing is often a strategic response to occupation and the perceived failure of other forms of resistance. Cultural anthropologist Scott Atran has similarly found that suicide attacks are not primarily motivated by religious beliefs. In his field research and interviews with militant leaders, Atran reported that the promise of religious rewards was not cited as a motivating factor, stating that he had never encountered a case where such beliefs were a central motivator for martyrdom. Atran also highlights that some of the most active suicide bombing groups in recent history have been secular or only nominally religious, such as those affiliated with nationalist movements rather than religious institutions. Interviews with families of Palestinian and Muslim suicide bombers often did not show consistent expressions of pride or religious justification. Atran concluded that suicide attacks are more closely linked to political, social, and cultural factors than to religious doctrine.

==== 72 virgins ====
According to Ami Pedahzur and Assaf Moghadam another motivator is the promise of rewards in the afterlife, as described in Islamic teachings and various hadiths. (Note: Prominent examples include Quran 2:154, which states, "And call not those who are slain in the way of Allah 'dead.' Nay, they are living, only ye perceive not," and Quran 9:111, which says, "Surely Allah has bought from the believers their persons and their property—theirs (in return) is the Garden. They fight in Allah's way, so they slay and are slain".) These rewards include forgiveness of sins, protection from hell, a crown of glory, marriage to seventy-two virgins (houris), and the ability to extend these privileges to seventy relatives. These promises create a strong incentive for individuals to undertake martyrdom, viewing it as a way to trade their limited earthly possessions for the luxurious rewards promised in paradise. Reports indicate that many are convinced of these rewards, which significantly influences their willingness to undertake martyrdom. Reportedly, there has been at least one case of a suicide bomber taking steps, like wrapping toilet paper around their genitals, to preserve their ability to enjoy these rewards. Palestinian media has framed martyrdom in terms of marriage to virgins, further solidifying this expectation.

However, the story of the 72 virgins promised to suicide bombers in paradise is a myth with no basis in Islam, and it is an Islamophobic trope. The majority of Palestinian suicide bombers are educated and not driven by economic despair. Furthermore, Jihadi leaders themselves reject candidates who seek self-sacrifice for rewards like virgins, as these individuals are considered unfit for such missions. Instead, suicide bombers are typically selected for their ideological commitment, patience, and planning abilities. The 72 virgins trope is not relevant to Palestinian religious life, and instead has often been perpetuated by western media. Muslim scholars emphasize that it is not part of Islamic teachings.

Scott Atran, a cultural anthropologist researching terrorism, argued against the narrative that suicide bombers are primarily motivated by the belief in rewards such as 72 virgins. In his research and interviews with jihadi leaders, Atran asserts that he has never encountered a case where suicide bombers were driven by such beliefs, emphasizing that if anyone were to approach jihadi leaders seeking martyrdom for the promise of virgins, the door would immediately be "slammed in their face."

Political scientist Robert Pape stated in a study of over 2,200 suicide attacks carried out over a 30-year period that 95% of these attacks had nothing to do with promises of 72 virgins or heavenly rewards. Instead, they were a response to foreign occupation; 90% of the attacks were anti-American and occurred in regions under U.S. occupation. The study also noted a dramatic decline in suicide bombings in Israel after the country withdrew from Gaza and parts of the West Bank. Pape argued that suicide bombing is primarily driven by cultural divides, and the failure of other forms of resistance, with suicide bombing emerging as a last resort.

==== Non-Palestinian Islamic opinions ====
Some Islamic theologians and jurists, including Yusuf al-Qaradawi, who hosted the weekly TV show Sharia and Life on Al-Jazeera, have condemned terrorist attacks by Al-Qaeda and similar groups, but not Palestinian suicide bombings against Israeli civilians. Yusuf al-Qaradawi argues that Israel is a militarized state that has, since its founding, seized Palestinian land and displaced its people through persecution, torture, and humiliation. He uses the "doctrine of necessity" to justify Palestinian guerrilla warfare and martyrdom operations as a last resort, claiming that peaceful means to regain their homeland have been exhausted. Others argue that universal conscription in Israel blurs the line between civilians and soldiers: since every Israeli citizen has served, is serving, or will serve in the military, they are seen by terrorists as part of the military effort and therefore complicit in the occupation of the West Bank and Gaza.

=== Economic motives ===
Another significant motivator for suicide bombers is the financial and social support provided to their families following the attack. Suicide bombers' families often receive substantial cash payments, ranging from $1,000 to several thousand dollars, from organizations such as Hamas or the PIJ, and occasionally from external supporters. In 2002, Iraqi president Saddam Hussein reportedly offered up to $25,000 to the families of Palestinian suicide bombers. This financial support, combined with the elevated social status bestowed upon the family due to the martyrdom of their member, leads to significant improvements in their living conditions and public standing. However, while economic hardship can drive some Palestinians to seek martyrdom, it alone does not fully explain the phenomenon. Economic deprivation has been a long-standing issue, and some suicide bombers come from relatively affluent families. Claude Berrebi of the RAND Corporation found that nearly 60% of suicide bombers recruited by Hamas and Islamic Jihad had education beyond high school, whereas less than 15% of the general adult male Palestinian population did. Additionally, these bombers were significantly less likely to come from impoverished backgrounds compared to their peers.

=== Nationalist motives ===
Many Palestinian suicide bombers are motivated by nationalist sentiments, joining groups like Hamas, PIJ, and Fatah to fight perceived injustices and defend their land against what they see as encroachment by the "Zionist entity". This sense of injustice associated with the 1948 displacement and the Israeli occupation, drives their willingness to die for their cause. The significance of land and home in Palestinian culture, combined with the feeling of humiliation and frustration, fuels their resolve. Nationalist fervor is also linked to the concept of "national Jihad," which aims to bolster Palestinian identity and pride through "resistance". Suicide bombings are viewed as a potent tactic in asymmetric warfare, designed to instill fear in Israeli society and demonstrate Palestinian resolve. Lacking the ability to directly confront Israel's superior military might, and convinced that negotiations will never lead to the creation of a Palestinian state, a significant part of the Palestinian population sees martyrdom operations as the only means of forcing Israel to meet their demands.

Hamas spokesmen claimed that suicide bombings instilled significant fear among the "Zionist occupiers". They celebrated the notion that life in Israel had become akin to "hell" and argued that these attacks undermined the Zionist goal of a secure haven for Jews, and led to doubts about Israel's future as well as substantial emigration. Influential Islamic scholar Yusuf al-Qaradawi stated that "The Palestinian who blows himself up is a person who is defending his homeland. When he attacks an occupier enemy, he is attacking a legitimate target." Former Hamas leader Abdel Aziz al-Rantisi, reacting to the 2001 Dolphinarium discotheque massacre, stated that Palestinians "will never approve of the occupation of [their] homeland."

=== Humiliation and retaliation ===
Another key motivator for suicide bombers is the desire for revenge, driven by "perceptions of personal harm, unfairness, and injustice, as well as the anger, indignation, and hatred associated with such perceptions". Students from middle-class backgrounds at An-Najah National University, a group with a high representation among suicide bombers in the Palestinian territories, reportedly said that "Martyrs give us dignity to free ourselves". This reflects the widespread sentiment among Palestinians that daily life in the occupied territories is marked by fear, despair, and constant humiliation, which provoke strong sense of justice and a desire for revenge.

Cognitive psychology studies on Palestinians living in the West Bank and Gaza report that "members of different militant groups often attribute their own violent acts to personal or collective humiliation experienced at the hands of their oppressors". Political scientist Hilal Khashan argues that collective Palestinian frustration, exacerbated by failed peace initiatives and Israel's military dominance, has fostered a suicidal mentality among impoverished Palestinians, particularly in refugee camps, and led to increased support for radical political Islam.

In a region heavily affected by conflict, many Palestinians are driven by personal losses and seek to avenge the deaths or injuries of close friends or family members. Revenge is a powerful motivator, often expressed during funeral processions and reflected in the personal testimonies of bombers who admit that avenging fallen loved ones was a primary reason for their actions. Interviews conducted by Brym and Araj with the families and friends of Palestinian suicide bombers suggest that these individuals do not exhibit higher levels of depression than what is typically observed in the general population.

Research by Kimhi and Even identifies four profiles of Palestinian suicide bombers. One type is the "exploited suicide bomber," driven by personal crises or a desire to atone for perceived sins such as extramarital relationships, homosexuality, or cooperation with Israel. Another profile is the "seeking retribution for suffering" bomber, which they identified as a major prototype of Palestinian suicide bombers.

== Strategic explanations ==
Palestinian suicide bombings have been interpreted as a political and military strategy rather than acts driven solely by individual motivations. From this perspective, they are viewed as deliberate actions by organised groups under military occupation, aimed at forcing occupiers to withdraw by causing heavy casualties and drawing media attention, or at strengthening the group's position against rival organisations.

=== Occupation ===
Political scientist Robert Pape argues that suicide attacks are not driven by religious fundamentalism, but are a rational strategy used by weaker groups against democratic states to force the withdrawal of troops from occupied territories these groups see as their homeland. While religion can be used as a recruitment tool, the main motivation is the strategic military objectives of terrorist organisations: "There is strong evidence that Islamic fundamentalism has not been the driving force behind Palestinian suicide terrorism". According to Pape, suicide bombing is effective: "The main reason that suicide terrorism is growing is that terrorists have learned that it works". He argues that the suicide campaigns by Hamas and Islamic Jihad against Israel in 1994-1995 provide a key test of these theories. He believes these groups thought the bombings would speed up Israel's withdrawal from Gaza and the West Bank, an assessment shared by other observers and Israeli leaders, which ultimately proved correct.

Critics argue that Pape overstates the effectiveness of suicide terrorism, and that the link between suicide bombing and foreign occupation is weak, as is the link with the democratic nature of the occupying countries. They propose alternative explanations, such as the inter-group competition (or "outbidding") theory.

=== Group competition (outbidding) ===
The outbidding theory suggests that competing political organisations use suicide bombings to show their commitment to the cause and gain popular support. Unlike Pape's view of suicide bombings as a direct tool of coercion against the state, the outbidding theory interprets suicide bombings as a form of "domestic political signaling": a way of sending a powerful political message within one's own political community. The Israeli-Palestinian conflict illustrates this outbidding process, with groups such as Hamas and Islamic Jihad using suicide bombings to capture the Palestinian imagination and compete for leadership not only with each other but also with the Palestinian Authority.

Terrorism scholar Mia Bloom argues that in Israel/Palestine, "the bombings became a method of recruitment for militant Islamic organizations within the Palestinian community. They serve at one and the same time to attack the hated enemy (Israel) and give legitimacy to outlier militant groups who compete with the Palestinian Authority (PA) for leadership of the community". She observes that support for suicide bombings was lower during periods of optimism for peace, such as during the Oslo process and the early PA elections, but as the peace process stalled and the PA's credibility waned, backing for militant groups increased. Bloom concludes that Israeli efforts to weaken the PA unintentionally strengthened more militant groups. She also argues that Israel's targeted killings of terrorist leaders may benefit these groups by creating "nationalist myths, martyrs, and cults of personality".

== Recruitment, training and planning ==
=== Recruitment ===
Recruitment for suicide missions by Palestinians groups generally involves a selective process where potential candidates are chosen based on their religious commitment, loyalty, and ability to maintain secrecy. Palestinian groups prefer to identify and approach individuals who have already demonstrated strong ideological alignment. Recruiters often target students and young people in mosques, universities, social activities, and in Israeli prisons. Candidates are scrutinized for their ability to handle psychological pressure, their personal and family backgrounds, and their criminal records.

=== Training ===
The training for suicide bombers typically lasts from several weeks to months and is designed to prepare candidates practically, mentally and spiritually. It begins with rigorous indoctrination, involving classes on specific Quranic and Hadith teachings about martyrdom and the afterlife, as well as exposure to anti-Israeli propaganda. Candidates also undergo spiritual purification through fasting, extensive prayer, and seeking forgiveness for past sins. The process also includes psychological conditioning, with evaluations to ensure candidates are not clinically depressed or suicidal but are genuinely committed. Practical training includes handling and assembling explosive devices, performing detonations, and practicing escape routes, often through simulated missions to ensure familiarity with procedures and equipment.

=== Planning ===
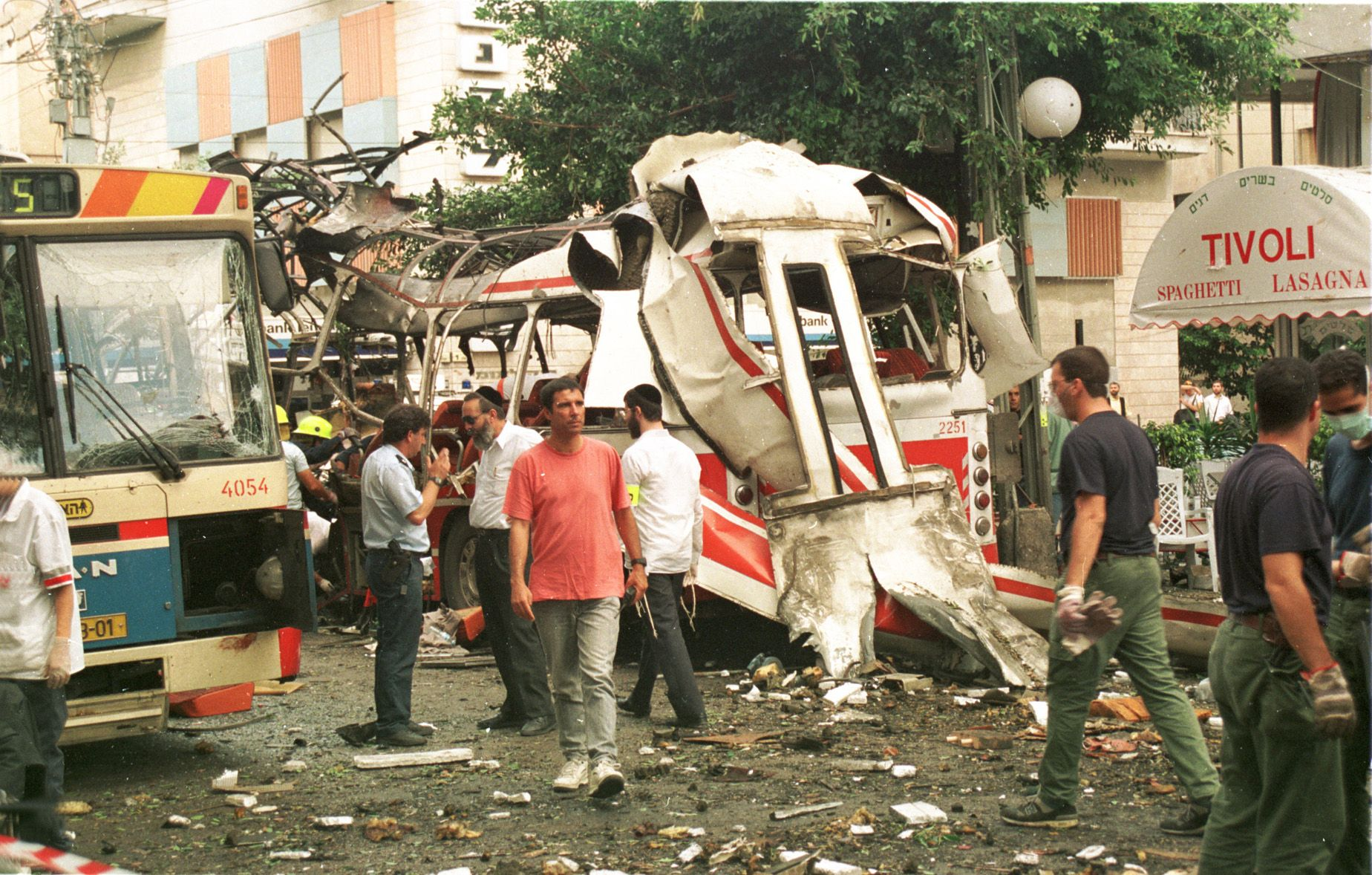
Targets have included shopping centers, public buses, nightclubs, eateries, and places frequented by teenagers and children. Pictured: The Dizengoff Street bus bombing in central Tel Aviv, 1994, which killed 20 civilians.

The planning of suicide attacks is executed with utmost secrecy and strict compartmentalization. This detailed process involves gathering intelligence, procuring weapons—often smuggled from Egypt or Iran—and organizing logistics. The planning is divided into specific roles: organizational leadership sets strategic goals, operators manage the selection and preparation of bombers, and aides handle material acquisition and logistical support. In some cases, foreign countries have been involved in training and planning Palestinian suicide bombings. For instance, after his arrest in 1996, Hasan Salama, a senior Hamas member, admitted that he had been trained in Iran to prepare for attacks against Israeli targets.

According to Assaf Moghadam, as the mission approaches, candidates typically disappear from their homes and families to avoid detection. They undergo final intensive training and briefings about their specific attack. In the days before the mission, candidates often record a final message, which may include a declaration of their intent and a call for others to follow their example. These recordings are usually made against the backdrop of the organizational symbols and often include religious elements.

Bombers are typically given disguises, such as Jewish religious clothing, Israeli military uniforms, or tourist clothing, and are instructed to target crowded public places while avoiding security checkpoints. Targets have included shopping centers, public buses, nightclubs, eateries, and places popular with teenagers and children. Final preparations include writing a will, performing religious rites, and finalizing operational details.

Bruce Hoffman notes that Palestinian suicide bombings have been strategically employed to provoke a response from Israel that can be used for propaganda. Hamas used suicide attacks to provoke an aggressive response from Israel, aiming to present its violence as defensive and superior to that of rival Palestinian groups. This approach seeks to garner international sympathy for the terrorists and critique the Israeli reaction, thereby shaping both public opinion and international support.

=== Involvement of women ===
Islamic groups initially excluded women from active participation in suicide bombings. However, this changed during the Second Intifada as groups like the Al-Aqsa Martyrs' Brigades began to utilize female suicide bombers. By 2003, Palestinian Islamic Jihad took responsibility for two female bombers.

Eventually, Hamas also recognized female martyrs, in what has been described by the group as a "significant evolution". The first among them was Reem Riyashi, a young mother of two, who carried out the Erez Crossing bombing in January 2004.

Several scholars observed that the recruitment of female suicide bombers by Palestinian groups was driven by the need to bypass Israeli security measures and checkpoint barriers. There have also been reports of Palestinian women who, under psychological or physical coercion, were driven to carry out suicide attacks due to the perceived dishonor they brought upon their families.

=== Foreign influence ===
The influence of Hezbollah, a Lebanese Shia organization, is evident in the suicide attacks conducted by both Hamas and the Palestinian Islamic Jihad (PIJ). Both groups adopted Hezbollah's procedures for selecting and training suicide bombers, including psychological preparation, writing farewell letters, and making videotapes. Khaled Meshal, Hamas's political leader, stated in July 2000, "We always have the Lebanese experiment before our eyes... It was a great model of which we are proud." Fathi Shiqaqi, founder of the PIJ, said he developed a plan for "exceptional" martyrdom operations based on Hezbollah's theological justifications. PIJ leader Ramadan Shalah acknowledged that the group's suicide bombings were influenced by Hezbollah's 1983 bombings.

=== Comparative research ===
Comparing Palestinian bombings to those carried out by other groups highlights several differences in tactics and target selection. Palestinian suicide attacks predominantly aimed at civilians and were often conducted by newly recruited members. In contrast, in Sri Lanka, the Tamil Tigers primarily targeted military objectives or high-profile civilian figures and employed a specialized unit known as the Black Tigers specifically for these operations.

== Palestinian public opinion ==
Among Palestinians, suicide attacks are typically followed by demonstrations of support, the distribution of pamphlets, and large funerals attended by hundreds or thousands of supporters. Instead of grieving, families are encouraged to celebrate the deaths of their loved ones. Additionally, streets, schools, and public squares are often named in honor of the deceased martyrs. The culture of martyrdom is deeply embedded, evident in various forms including naming sports tournaments after suicide bombers or featuring dramas about figures like the bomb maker Yahya Ayyash.

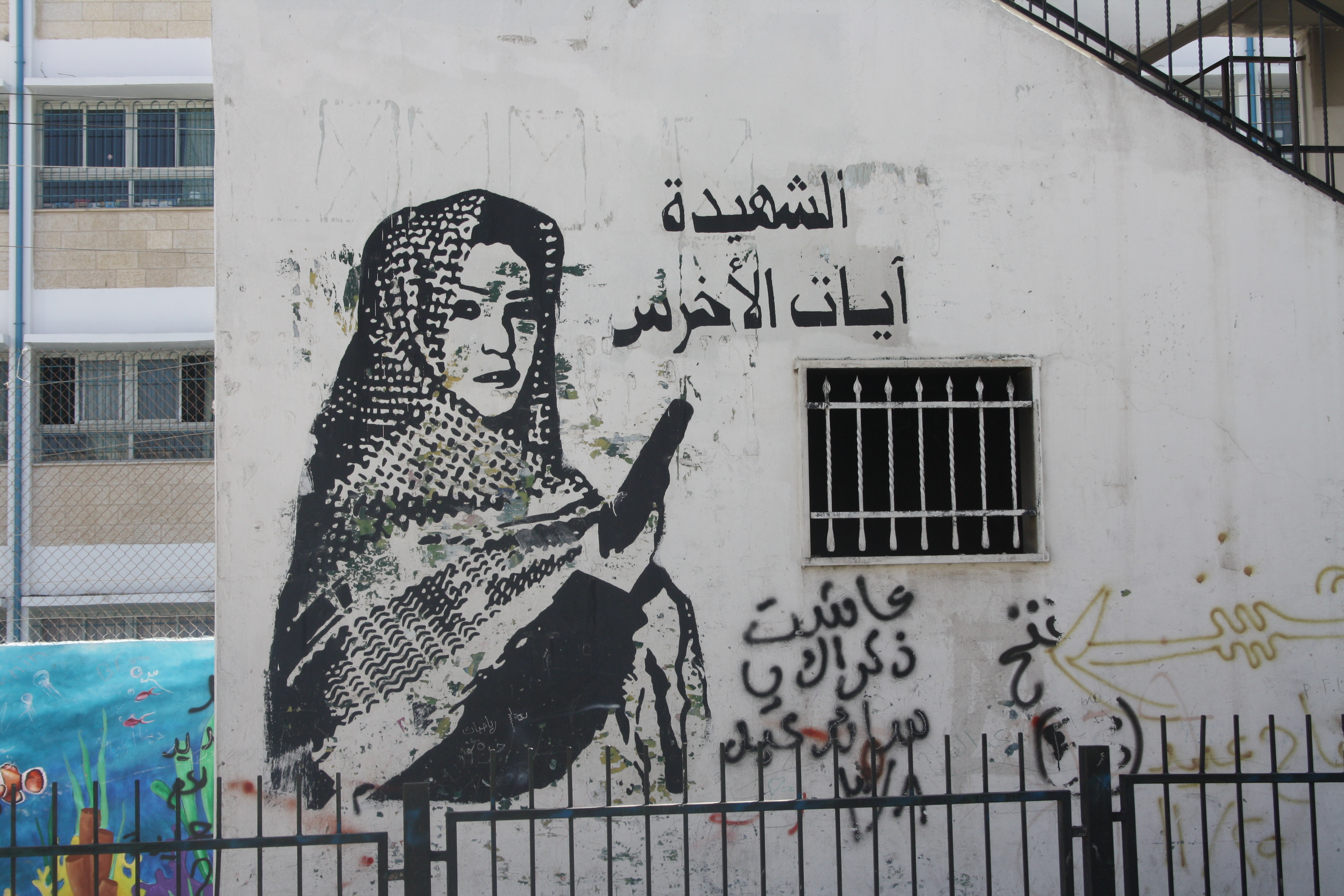
Mural of Ayat al-Akhras, a teenage suicide bomber who killed two people in a Jerusalem supermarket in 2002, displayed at a girls' school in her hometown of Dheisheh.

Palestinian organizations have used various methods to promote their activities, including displaying posters of suicide bombers in communities, sharing videos and photos of martyrs on social media, employing imams to incite violence in mosques, integrating such messages into the education system, and organizing summer camps where children receive training in weapon use and survival skills. Victor notes that Palestinian children as young as six often express a wish to become martyrs, although they may not fully comprehend its significance. By twelve, they usually have a clearer understanding and are more committed to the idea.

The Palestinian Authority (PA) has also supported the commemoration of suicide bombers, reflecting a growing unity among Palestinians around this practice. In 2002, the Palestinian Authority named a soccer tournament after Abdel Baset Odeh, the Hamas suicide bomber responsible for the Passover massacre that killed 30 people during the Passover Seder in Netanya. While other tournaments had been named after Palestinian suicide bombers, this was the first instance of such an honor being given by the PA to a Hamas affiliate.

Before 1996, public support for suicide bombings among Palestinians was below 30 percent. By 1999, support for 'martyrdom operations' was 26.1%, but it rose to 66.2% three months into the Second Intifada. In the summer of 2001, support for suicide bombings peaked at over 70%, according to a Palestinian Center for Public Opinion poll. By the summer of 2002, this support had decreased slightly but remained strong, with more than two-thirds of Palestinians endorsing such attacks.

== Patterns and trends ==
=== Overview ===
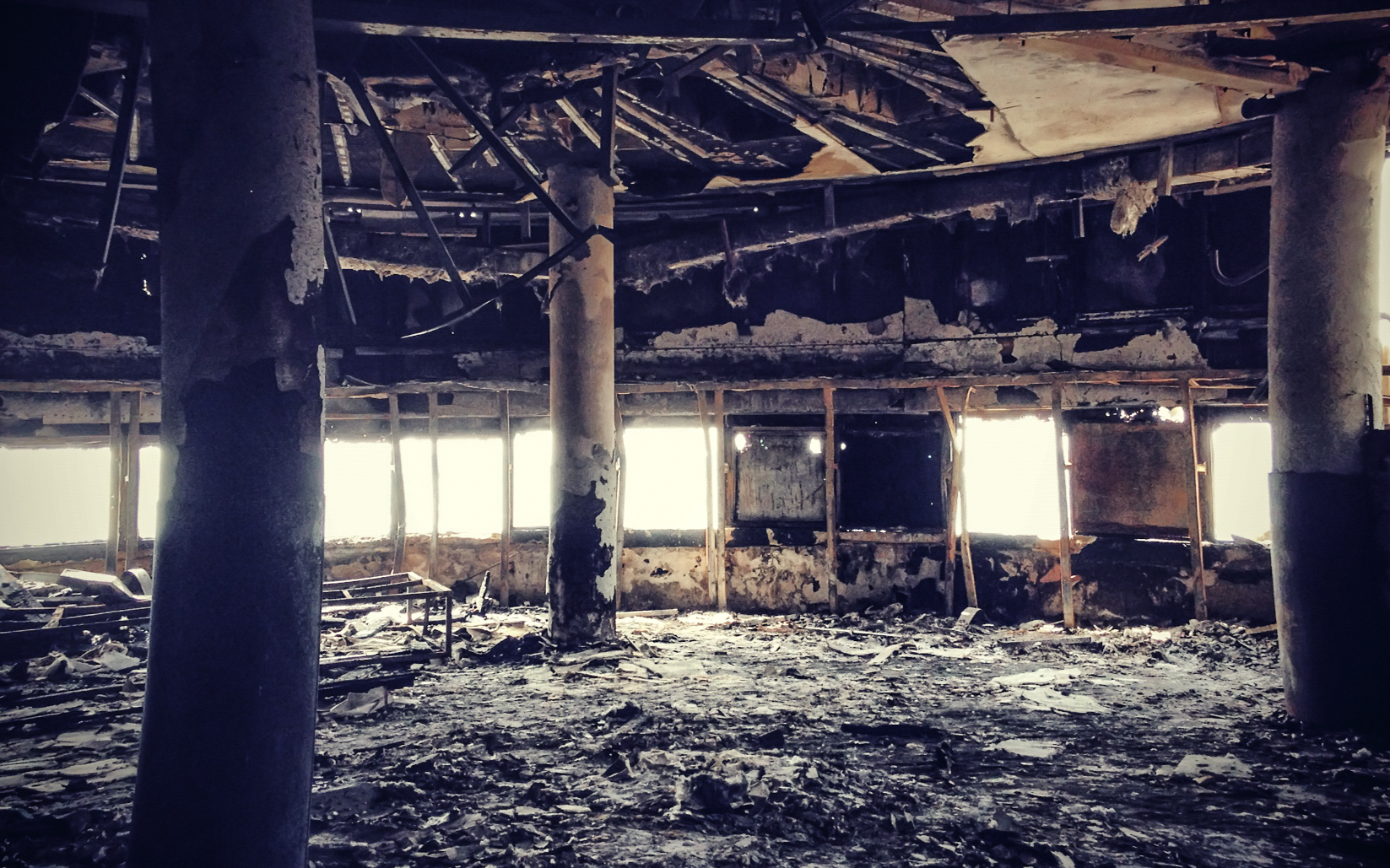
The aftermath of the PIJ suicide bombing at the Dolphinarium discotheque in Tel Aviv, June 2001, which killed 21 people, mostly teenagers.

The emergence of Palestinian suicide bombings in the 1990s represented a significant escalation in violence compared to the earlier First Intifada (1987–1993). Almost all Palestinian suicide bombings targeted civilians, and were carried out by newly recruited members. Between 1993 and early August 2002, over 135 Palestinian suicide bombers carried out attacks targeting Israeli civilians and soldiers.

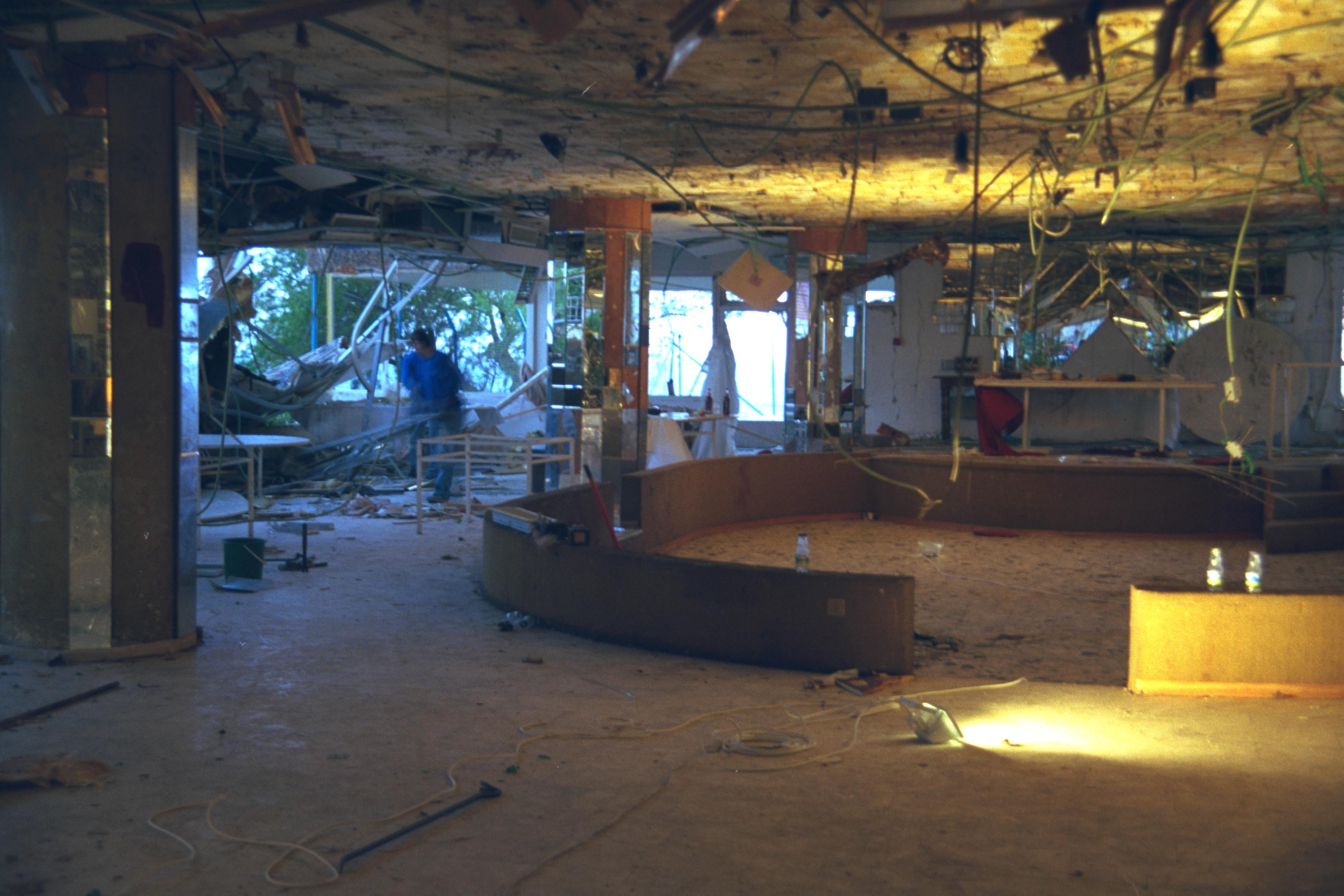
The bloodiest suicide attack was the 2002 Passover massacre, when a Hamas-affiliated bomber, disguised as a woman, detonated an explosive device in the dining room of a hotel during seder. The attack killed 30 guests and injured 140 others.

Overall, during the Second Intifada, from September 2000 to February 2005, there were approximately 116 suicide attacks carried out by 127 bombers. Notable among these was the Dolphinarium discotheque massacre in June 2001, when a PIJ suicide bomber detonated at a Tel Aviv nightclub, killing 21 people, most of whom were teenagers. The bloodiest attack was the Passover massacre in March 2002, when Hamas-affiliated Abd al-Bassat Ouda, disguised as a woman, detonated a ten-kilogram bomb in the dining room of the Park Hotel in Netanya during Passover seder, killing 30 guests and injuring 140 others. In March 2002 alone there were 23 attacks, resulting in 135 Israeli deaths. Palestinian suicide terrorism reached its zenith during this year, and then saw a gradual decline, with attacks ceasing by 2005.

During the Second Intifada, the typical expense of a suicide bombing was around $150. Despite this low cost, such attacks resulted in six times more deaths and approximately twenty-six times more casualties than other forms of terrorism.

On August 18, 2024, an attempted suicide bombing in Tel Aviv, claimed by Hamas and the Palestinian Islamic Jihad, resulted in the bomber's death and wounded a passerby. The bombing, which detonated prematurely near a local synagogue, is one of the rare instances of such attacks in Israel since the Second Intifada and may be the first suicide attack since 2016. On 27 August 2024, Khaled Mashal, former chairman of the Hamas Political Bureau, called for the resumption of Palestinian suicide bombings in Israel and the West Bank.

=== Targets ===
According to a 2006 study from the University of Haifa, common targets for Palestinian suicide bombings have included everyday public spaces such as markets, shops, buses, restaurants, bars, coffee shops, and shopping malls. These locations have been frequently chosen due to their accessibility, the large number of civilians present, and the ease with which attackers can blend in. The University of Haifa study included 120 suicide bombings documented between 1994 and 2005 in Israel (which the authors defined as including Israeli-occupied territories), the paper categorized targets as follows:

- Buses, bus stops, and bus stations: 65 attacks (54%)
- Bars, restaurants, coffee shops, and discotheques: 17 attacks (14%)
- Shopping malls: 11 attacks (9%)
- Open markets: 5 attacks (4%)
- Roadblocks: 5 attacks (4%)
- Other places (such as hotels, clinics, and synagogues): 11 attacks (9%)
- Military targets: 6 attacks (5%)

A project from the University of Chicago included 176 "confirmed suicide attacks" in Israel and Palestine, including the same time period and later. They defined a much larger number of locations and individuals as military or other security forces targets. They classified 69 targets at "security" (police or military), including 66 Israeli security targets and 3 Hamas government targets in the Gaza Strip. They described the individuals targeted in 44 "confirmed suicide attacks" as either "IDF", "army", "navy", "soldiers", or "troops", plus an additional four "unconfirmed" suicides with similarly described targets. Three additional attacks targeted Hamas government police or "Hamas Interior Border Security Forces" in the Gaza Strip.

According to a University of Haifa study, buses and transportation hubs have been particularly attractive to perpetrators due to their frequent use and the anonymity they offer. Although increased security at some locations has reduced accessibility, such as central bus stations and shopping malls, attacks have continued to target areas where large crowds gather and security is less stringent. The selection of targets has been influenced by factors such as distance, ease of access, and the presence of large groups, although these variables have also been affected by time and the effort required to reach the target.

=== Geographic origins ===
Palestinian suicide terrorism largely stemmed from urban centers and adjacent refugee camps in the Gaza Strip and West Bank. Jenin has been described as the 'capital' of Palestinian suicide terrorism, with attacks originating from the city responsible for the deaths of 124 people. According to Israeli intelligence, Hamas primarily operated from the northern West Bank, notably around Nablus, while the Islamic Jihad focused its activities in Jenin. Although both groups maintained a presence in Gaza, their operations were limited by the Gaza Strip's surrounding fence, confining their attacks to local targets such as soldiers, security personnel, and settlers.

=== Geographic distribution ===
Kliot and Charney's study of 120 Palestinian suicide attacks from 1994 to September 2005 shows that most attacks targeted major Israeli cities, with Jerusalem experiencing the highest number (30), followed by Tel Aviv (11), and Haifa (7). Smaller cities and towns also suffered attacks, including Netanya (6) and cities in the Tel Aviv metropolitan area (10). Around 65% of the attacks occurred in cities, reflecting their accessibility and potential to cause mass casualties. The remainder of the attacks took place in the Gaza Strip (14), the West Bank (7) and smaller, less logical targets, often due to planning limitations or proximity to Palestinian centers in the West Bank. Attacks in Israeli settlements in the West Bank and Gaza were minimal, likely due to strong security measures.

== Impact and aftermath ==
=== Counterterrorism ===
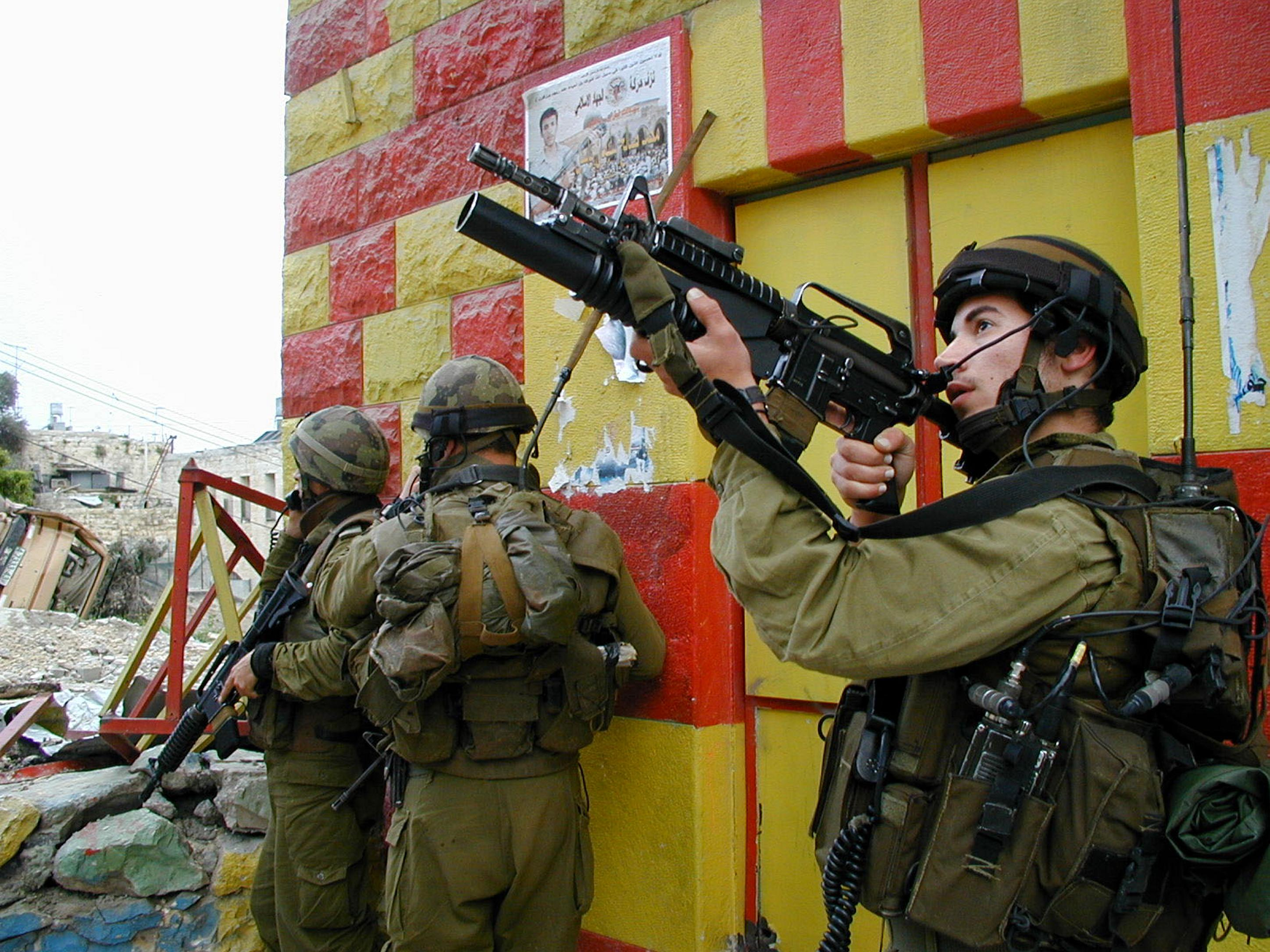
In 2002, Israel launched Operation Defensive Shield to dismantle infrastructure in Palestinian urban centers and refugee camps. Photo taken in Jenin, a major center for suicide terrorism during this period.

Israel has preferred targeted assassinations to address suicide terrorism, believing that capturing their targets alive would result in higher Israeli casualties. In 1995, Israel carried out assassinations of key militant leaders, such as PIJ's Fathi Shaqaqi in Malta in October 1995 and Hamas' Yahya Ayyash three months later. Ayyash, known as "the Engineer," was a master bomb maker responsible for numerous attacks and had first proposed using suicide bombings. His death, however, led to another wave of attacks. Following a surge of suicide bombings in early 1996, the Israeli government established an extensive and costly security system to protect borders, roads, and key installations. This included new security units focused on public transport and school security.

In early 2002, a wave of terror attacks culminating in the deadly Passover massacre challenged Israeli PM Ariel Sharon's deterrence-based strategy, as the violence intensified despite Israeli military efforts. Sharon's response evolved from targeted assassinations to a more comprehensive approach aimed at dismantling terrorist infrastructure. This led to Operation Defensive Shield, which involved reoccupying areas under Palestinian Authority control to counteract terrorism. The operation targeted the infrastructure of Palestinian terrorism across six major cities, including Bethlehem, Nablus, Ramallah, Tulkarm, Qalqilya, and Jenin, with the latter—being a major source of terrorism—experiencing intense fighting. Yasser Arafat was isolated in his Ramallah headquarters, which remained under siege until 2004, and his authority declined.

Despite Operation Defensive Shield's reduction of terrorist capabilities, attacks continued, leading to increased public pressure for the construction of the West Bank barrier, which began in 2002. By August 2003, the main section of the barrier was completed, significantly impacting attack patterns. Initially, the number of suicide bombings declined sharply, from 19 in 2003 to 6 in 2004 and 5 in 2005. Between the barrier's completion and June 2004, only three terror attacks originated from the northern West Bank and breached Israel, exploiting incomplete sections of the barrier. In contrast, from September 2000 to June 2003, 73 attacks from the same area had penetrated this section.

The barrier has shifted the focus of attacks to less protected regions, including Gaza, southern Israel, and parts of Jerusalem, as well as areas where the barrier was not yet constructed such as the area of Rosh HaAyin and the Beth Shean valley. Attackers have been forced to adopt longer and more challenging routes, leading to a decrease in attacks. Overall, by 2008, it was observed that while the barrier has not entirely halted suicide bombings, it has effectively redirected and complicated the attackers' efforts.

=== Political outcomes ===
The attacks hardened Israeli public attitudes toward Palestinians as potential partners in a two-state peace agreement.

The 1990s saw Hamas using suicide bombings to disrupt the Oslo Accords and the peace process, aiming to weaken the Palestine Liberation Organization (PLO) and polarize Israeli politics. Within a month of the Oslo Accords signing, Hamas launched a new series of bombings that killed twenty-six Israelis and injured many more. This violent response conveyed Hamas's position that peace and security could not be achieved "unless and until Hamas [was] recognized and its demands [were] met."

In 1996, a series of devastating Hamas suicide bombings, which resulted in significant casualties and nearly half the death toll from the previous two years, is often credited with shaping the results of the 1996 Israeli general election. The bombings intensified public fear and shifted voter sentiment, contributing to Benjamin Netanyahu's victory over Shimon Peres. Netanyahu's hard-line stance on security became more appealing to voters. When Netanyahu began his term, he focused his political agenda on "combating terrorism". Unlike the previous government's approach of "addressing terrorism and peace separately", Netanyahu's policy emphasized pursuing peace only in the absence of "terror" for Israelis.

In September 2000, Hamas led the Second Intifada, which was marked by hundreds of suicide bombings that left hundreds of Israelis dead and thousands injured. In August 2005, Israel's unilateral disengagement from the Gaza Strip was seen as a direct consequence of Hamas's terror campaign. Hamas won elections to the Palestinian Legislative Council, leading to clashes with Fatah that eventually resulted in Hamas taking control of Gaza while the PLO retained authority over the West Bank.

=== Inspiration for other Islamist groups ===
The use of suicide bombing by Palestinian Islamist groups is believed to have influenced organizations such as Hezbollah and Al-Qaeda. Al-Qaeda, a transnationalist Islamist group, employed this tactic in high-profile attacks, including the 1998 US embassy bombings in Kenya and Tanzania, the 2000 USS Cole bombing in Yemen, and ultimately the September 11 attacks on the United States in 2001. The latter marked a significant escalation in global terrorism, prompting widespread security reforms and further legitimizing the jihadi movement, attracting more foreign fighters to Al-Qaeda.

=== Changing tactics ===
Following the Second Intifada, Hamas shifted from using suicide bombings to focusing on rocket attacks against Israel. By 2005, Hamas began adopting a strategy similar to Hezbollah's, leveraging Iranian support and smuggling routes to build a significant rocket arsenal. In 2006–2007, Hamas took control of the Gaza Strip from Fatah and began ruling the territory. Operational challenges, such as the Gaza–Israel barrier and enhanced Israeli intelligence, limited the effectiveness of traditional suicide attacks. Consequently, Hamas adopted rocket fire against Israeli urban centers as a primary strategy, leading to substantial disruption and casualties in southern Israel and posing an ongoing threat to a larger civilian population. Alongside rocket attacks, the group has also engaged in shootings, stabbings, and vehicle-ramming attacks. Between Hamas' takeover in 2007 and 2023, the group engaged in several wars with Israel.

On 27 August 2024, Khaled Mashal, a high-ranking Hamas official and former leader, called for the resumption of Palestinian suicide bombings during a speech in Turkey. His call came a few weeks after a failed suicide bombing attempt in Tel Aviv on 18 August.

== In media ==
=== Movies ===
Paradise Now (2005), directed by Hany Abu-Assad, tells the story of two Palestinian friends recruited for a suicide bombing mission in Tel Aviv, exploring their motivations, doubts and the moral complexities of their actions. The film rejects the romantic notion of heroism and sacrifice: both main characters are disillusioned young men, trapped and suffocated by the occupation, far from the heroic figure of the martyr. While the film sparked controversy and accusations of sympathy for terrorists, Abu-Assad stated that his aim was to encourage dialogue rather than justify violence. The film received worldwide praise and was nominated for an Academy Award for Best Foreign Language Film.

The Attack (2012), based on the novel by Yasmina Khadra, centers on an Israeli-Palestinian surgeon, well integrated into Israeli society, whose wife is accused of being a suicide bomber. The film explores themes of identity, loyalty, and the personal toll of political conflict, and has been described as an "intelligent, involving movie that’s by turns a murder mystery and a politically charged argument about contemporary Palestinian identity".

=== Literature ===
In The Attack (2005), Yasmina Khadra tells the story of a fictional Palestinian surgeon with Israeli citizenship, who is forced to confront the realities of his environment when his wife is revealed to be a suicide bomber. The novel, on which the 2012 film is based, delves into the psychological and emotional aftermath of a suicide bombing in Tel Aviv. The book is translated from the original French.

=== Television and other media ===
Fauda is an Israeli television series that depicts the Israeli-Palestinian conflict from both sides. While it primarily focuses on Israeli undercover operations, it also portrays Palestinian militants involved in planning attacks, including Abu Ahmad ("The Panther"), a prominent Hamas operative in Season 1, and Al-Makdasi in Season 2. The series has been praised for its nuanced characters but also criticized for potentially reinforcing stereotypes. According to Sayed Kashua, "By introducing the terrorist group, Fauda allows viewers in the United States and Europe to see Al-Makdasi as their own enemy — and revel in the heroism of the brave Israelis who protect them from the barbarians".

=== News media and documentaries ===
Various documentaries and news specials have covered the phenomenon of Palestinian suicide bombings, including The Cult of the Suicide Bomber (2005) and Suicide Killers (2006).

== See also ==
- Use of child suicide bombers by Palestinian militant groups
- Martyrdom video
- Improvised explosive device

== Notes ==
=== Citations ===
1. "Archives: Jerusalem Post". Archived from the original on 8 November 2012.
2. Moghadam 2003, p. 65; Pedahzur, Perliger & Weinberg 2003, p. 419; Kliot & Charney 2006, pp. 353, 359, 361; Cohen 2016, p. 753
3. Moghadam 2003, p. 65; Pedahzur, Perliger & Weinberg 2003, p. 419; Kliot & Charney 2006, pp. 353, 359, 361; Cohen 2016, p. 753; Aran 2023
4. Pedahzur 2006, p. 42; Kliot & Charney 2006, pp. 366–367
5. Kliot & Charney 2006, p. 361.
6. Moghadam 2003, p. 68.
7. Horowitz 2015, p. 72.
8. Gupta & Mundra 2005, p. 578; Nanninga 2019, p. 7; Hoffman 2017, pp. 159–160; Siniver 2023, p. 279
9. Nanninga 2019, p. 7.
10. Gupta & Mundra 2005, p. 578.
11. Merari et al. 2010, p. 118.
12. Moghadam 2003, pp. 69–71.
13. Moghadam 2003, p. 87.
14. Pedahzur 2006, pp. 30–31.
15. Ganor 2015, pp. 76–77.
16. Siniver 2023, pp. 161–162.
17. Mpoke Bigg & Sobelman 2024.
18. Moghadam 2003, p. 65.
19. Ganor 2015, pp. 142–143.
20. Hoffman 2017, pp. 159–160.
21. Pedahzur 2006, p. 16.
22. Collins, Dave (29 August 2019). "Hamas says it captured cell behind Gaza suicide bombings that killed 3 cops". The Times of Israel.
23. Levy, Elior; Kais, Roi (17 August 2017). "Hamas commander killed in ISIS suicide bombing at Rafah crossing". Ynetnews.
24. "Deadly Explosions Target Hamas Police Checkpoints in Gaza". The New York Times. 28 August 2019. Archived from the original on 28 August 2019.
25. "MES Insights, vol. 14, no. 6".
26. Serge, Schmemann (5 March 2010). "Bombing in Israel:The Overview;4th Terror Blast in Israel Kills 14 at Mall in Tel Aviv; Nine-Day Toll Grows to 61". The New York Times. Archived from the original on 29 March 2023.
27. Moghadam 2003, pp. 78–80.
28. Litvak 2010, pp. 724–725.
29. Hoffman 2017, p. 94.
30. Robert Pape (2005). Dying to Win: The Strategic Logic of Suicide Terrorism. Random House. pp. 66–68. ISBN 978-1-4000-6317-8.
31. Ganor 2015, p. 157.
32. "Suicide and Other Bombing Attacks in Israel Since the Declaration of Principles (Sept 1993)". embassies.gov.il. Archived from the original on 13 November 2024.
33. Siniver 2023, p. 300.
34. Moghadam 2003, pp. 81–82.
35. Moghadam 2003, pp. 80–82.
36. Pedahzur 2006, p. 64.
37. Hatina 2014, p. 99.
38. Moghadam 2003, pp. 82–83.
39. Pedahzur 2006, p. 45.
40. "Ahmad Saadat re-elected as PFLP leader – www.israelhayom.com". www.israelhayom.com.
41. Benn, Aluf. "Minister Rehavam Ze'evi assassinated by PFLP".
42. Aderet, Ofer. "Palmach veterans balk at memorial for ex-general Rehavam Ze'evi".
43. "'Jund Ansar Allah leader killed himself'". JPost.com The Jerusalem Post. 14 August 2009.
44. "Profile: Jund Ansar Allah". 2009-08-15.
45. "News of Terrorism and the Israeli-Palestinian Conflict: June 2-9, 2009". Intelligence and Terrorism Information Center. 9 June 2009. Archived from the original on 16 June 2009.
46. "Hamas says Gaza now under control". BBC News. 15 August 2009.
47. "Islamist leader dies in Gaza battle". Al Jazeera English. 15 Aug 2009.
48. "Hamas and al Qaeda-linked group clash in Gaza". www.longwarjournal.org FDD's Long War Journal. 2009-08-14.
49. "FACTBOX: Five facts about Jund Ansar Allah". Reuters. 2009-08-15.
50. "Profile: Jund Ansar Allah". BBC News. 15 August 2009. "Moussa, a doctor and local cleric, was killed alongside 21 others in the ensuing battle. Hamas officials said he and an aide named Khaled Banat, a Syrian national of Palestinian origin also known as Abu Abdullah al-Muhajir, had blown themselves up using explosive vests."
51. Beaumont, Peter (2009-08-15). "Hamas destroys al-Qaida group in violent Gaza battle". The Observer. ISSN 0029-7712.
52. Marshall, Warren (2010-11-30). "Al-Qaeda in Gaza: Isolating "the Base"". Contemporary Voices: St Andrews Journal of International Relations. 1 (1). doi:10.15664/jtr.167 (inactive 13 October 2026). hdl:10023/5610. ISSN 2516-3159.
53. "All 24 victims of Friday". Maan News Agency.
54. "Islamist leader killed in clashes with Hamas police". France 24. 15 August 2009.
55. "Hamas guard killed in rare suicide attack in Gaza Strip". 18 August 2017.
56. "What Effect ISIS' Declaration of War Against Hamas Could Have in the Middle East". NPR. 15 January 2018.
57. "Cracking down on deviant ideology". 8 March 2014.
58. "Hamas militant killed by suicide bomber in Gaza". Los Angeles Times. New York City (AP) and Los Angeles (LA Times). Associated Press. 17 August 2017. Archived from the original on 29 October 2018.
59. Abuheweila, Iyad; Kershner, Isabel (10 January 2018). "ISIS Declares War on Hamas, and Gaza Families Disown Sons in Sinai (Published 2018)". The New York Times.
60. "Israel, West Bank, and Gaza".
61. Al-Mughrabi, Nidal (28 August 2019). "Explosions hit Gaza police checkpoints, three dead - officials". Reuters.
62. "Deadly explosions hit police checkpoints in Gaza Strip". 28 August 2019.
63. "Officials: Explosions Hit Gaza Police Checkpoints, Three Dead". 27 August 2019.
64. "Hamas: ISIS is behind the bombings in Gaza - North press agency". npasyria.com. North Press Agency. 28 August 2019. Archived from the original on 9 November 2024.
65. Soibelman 2004, pp. 88–89.
66. Pedahzur 2006, p. 62.
67. Moghadam 2006a, p. 89-90.
68. Fierke 2009, pp. 167–168.
69. Litvak 2010, p. 716.
70. Pedahzur 2006, pp. 64–65.
71. Hamamra, Bilal; Ruth Gould, Rebecca; Mayaleh, Asala (September 2024). "Against the depoliticisation of Palestinian female shahids". Third World Quarterly. 45 (13): 1929–1946. doi:10.1080/01436597.2024.2409917.
72. Hoffman 2017, p. 164.
73. Banat, Bassam Yousef Ibrahim (27 February 2015). "THE PROFILE OF THE PALESTINIAN SUICIDE MARTYRS (ISTISHHADIYIN)". European Scientific Journal, ESJ. 11 (5). ISSN 1857-7431.
74. Brym, Robert J.; Araj, Bader (2008). "Palestinian Suicide Bombing Revisited: A Critique of the Outbidding Thesis". Political Science Quarterly. 123 (3): 485–500. doi:10.1002/j.1538-165X.2008.tb00632.x. ISSN 0032-3195. JSTOR 20203051.
75. Pape, Robert A.; Feldman, James K. (7 October 2010). Cutting the Fuse: The Explosion of Global Suicide Terrorism and How to Stop It. University of Chicago Press. ISBN 978-0-226-64564-3.
76. Scott Atran. An Edge Discussion of BEYOND BELIEF: Science, Religion, Reason and Survival Salk Institute, La Jolla November 5-7, 2006 (S. Atran, N. Humphrey, S. Harris, D. Dennett, C. Porco, N.Chomsky). 2006. ffijn_00505418
77. Moghadam 2003, pp. 71–73.
78. Pedahzur 2006, pp. 90–92.
79. "Who Wants to be a Martyr?". Archived from the original on 2024-03-05.
80. "Studies into violent radicalisation; Lot 2 - The beliefs ideologies and narratives" (PDF). Archived from the original (PDF) on 2023-05-13.
81. "Palestinians aren't trying to go to heaven — they are fleeing hell". 3 November 2015.
82. "Suicide terrorism" (PDF). p. 26. Archived from the original (PDF) on 2020-03-21.
83. https://books.google.com/books?id=WovWAAAAMAA
84. Husain 2021, p. 1144.
85. Bloom 2005, p. 40.
86. Hassan 2011, p. 69.
87. Horowitz 2015, p. 79.
88. Moghadam 2003, pp. 75–76.
89. Berrebi 2007.
90. Moghadam 2003, pp. 74–75.
91. Khashan 2003, p. 1061.
92. Fierke 2009, p. 163.
93. Hassan 2011, p. 90.
94. Siniver 2023, p. 566.
95. Ginges & Atran 2008, p. 282.
96. Khashan 2003, p. 1064-1065.
97. Brym & Araj 2012, p. 79.
98. Horowitz 2015, p. 74-79.
99. Hassan 2011, pp. 41–51.
100. Brym & Araj 2006, pp. 1972–1973.
101. Brym & Araj 2006, p. 1973.
102. Asad 2007, p. 54-56.
103. Hassan 2011, pp. 43–44.
104. Pape 2005, 41/254.
105. Pape 2003, p. 350.
106. Pape 2005, 49/254.
107. Pape 2003, pp. 352–355.
108. Moghadam 2006b, p. 708.
109. Asad 2007, p. 55.
110. Horowitz 2015, p. 76.
111. Bloom 2006, p. 33.
112. Horowitz 2015, p. 76-77.
113. Hassan 2011, pp. 47–49.
114. Abufarha 2009, p. 191.
115. Horowitz 2015, p. 77.
116. Bloom 2005, p. 29.
117. Pisoiu & Hain 2018, p. 119-129.
118. Bloom 2005, p. 19.
119. Bloom 2006, p. 49.
120. Moghadam 2003, pp. 83–86.
121. Haberman, Clyde (20 October 1994). "20 Killed In Terrorist Bombing Of Bus In Tel Aviv". The New York Times.
122. Ganor 2015, p. 70.
123. Pedahzur 2006, p. 42.
124. Pedahzur 2006, p. 43.
125. Hoffman 2017, p. 159.
126. Pedahzur 2006, p. 47.
127. Thomas 2021, pp. 775–776.
128. McGreal 2004.
129. Pedahzur 2006, p. 21.
130. Pedahzur 2006, p. 99.
131. Stoil, Rebecca Anna (30 October 2011). "Kent State president lambasts Israel bashing professor". Jerusalem Post.
132. Pedahzur 2006, p. 38.
133. Midlarsky 2004, p. 188.
134. Gupta & Mundra 2005, p. 590.
135. Fierke 2009, p. 172.
136. Moghadam 2003, p. 76.
137. Fisher, Ian (29 January 2006). "In Hamas's Overt Hatred, Many Israelis See Hope". The New York Times.
138. "Israel Passover bomb suspect held". BBC News. 26 March 2008.
139. Pedahzur 2006, p. 56.
140. Kliot & Charney 2006, p. 371.
141. Ganor 2015, p. 111; Siniver 2023, pp. 161–162
142. Ganor 2015, p. 111.
143. Halder 2020, pp. 49–50.
144. Hoffman 2017, p. 141.
145. Fabian 2024.
146. JP Return to Martyrdom 2024.
147. Kliot & Charney 2006, pp. 366–367.
148. "The Database on Suicide Attacks (DSAT)". cpost.uchicago.edu UChicago CPOST. University of Chicago. 2 October 2020.
149. Kliot & Charney 2006, pp. 360–361.
150. "Jenin: IDF Military Operations". Human Rights Watch. 14, No. 3 (E) (May 2002). Archived from the original on September 14, 2008.
151. Pedahzur 2006, p. 49.
152. Ganor 2021, p. 189.
153. Ganor 2021, pp. 216–218; Siniver 2023, pp. 161–162
154. Ganor 2021, pp. 216–218.
155. Kliot & Charney 2006, pp. 364–365.
156. Siniver 2023, p. 279; Hoffman 2017, pp. 159–160
157. Hoffman 2017, p. 158.
158. Ganor 2021, p. 166.
159. Siniver 2023, p. 279.
160. Halder 2020, p. 107.
161. Ganor 2015, pp. 163–164.
162. Lidman 2024.
163. "What is Hamas and why is it fighting with Israel in Gaza?". BBC. 5 April 2024.
164. Nashef, Hania A.M. (January 2, 2016). "Demythologizing the Palestinian in Hany Abu-Assad's Omar and Paradise Now". Transnational Cinemas. 7 (1): 82–95. doi:10.1080/20403526.2015.1080984. ISSN 2040-3526.
165. Glaister, Dan (January 20, 2006). "'It was a joke I was even nominated'". The Guardian. ISSN 0261-3077.
166. "Bomb culture: Hany Abu-Assad's Paradise Now | Sight & Sound". British Film Institute. June 24, 2017.
167. "The Attack". Jewish Film Institute.
168. Dargis, Manohla (June 20, 2013). "First a Bombing, Then a Truth That's Elusive 'The Attack' Is a Politically Charged Mystery". New York Times. Archived from the original on March 4, 2014.
169. Murphy, Maureen Clare (December 18, 2006). "Book review: "The Attack: A Novel"". The Electronic Intifada.
170. Kashua, Sayed (September 5, 2024). "How a Netflix Hit Sanitizes the Israeli Occupation of the West Bank". Foreign Policy.
171. "The Cult of the Suicide Bomber (2004), PopMatters". www.popmatters.com. June 19, 2006.
172. "The mind of a suicide bomber / A politically incorrect film explores the bomb bearers' many motivations". Sfgate. October 22, 2006.

== Bibliography ==
=== Books and journals ===
- Abufarha, Nasser (July 24, 2009). The Making of a Human Bomb. Durham: Duke University Press. ISBN 978-0-8223-4428-5.
- Aran, Gideon (2023). The Cult of Dismembered Limbs: Jewish Rites of Death at the Scene of Palestinian Suicide Terrorism. New York: Oxford University Press. ISBN 978-0-197-68914-1.
- Asad, Talal (2007). On Suicide Bombing. New York: Columbia University Press. ISBN 978-0-231-14152-9. OCLC 71427045.
- Berrebi, Claude (2007). "Evidence About the Link Between Education, Poverty and Terrorism Among Palestinians". Peace Economics, Peace Science and Public Policy. 13 (1). doi:10.2202/1554-8597.1101.
- Bloom, Mia (2005). Dying to Kil l. New York, NY [u.a]: Columbia University Press. ISBN 978-0-231-13320-3.
- Bloom, Mia (2006). "Dying to kill: motivations for suicide terrorism". In Pedahzur, Ami (ed.). Root Causes of Suicide Terrorism. London: Routledge. pp. 25–53. ISBN 0-415-77030-0.
- Brym, Robert J.; Araj, Bader (2006). "Suicide Bombing as Strategy and Interaction: The Case of the Second Intifada". Social Forces. 84 (4). Oxford University Press: 1969–1986. doi:10.1353/sof.2006.0081. ISSN 0037-7732. JSTOR 3844485.
- Brym, RJ; Araj, B (2012). "Are suicide bombers suicidal?". Studies in Conflict & Terrorism. 35 (6): 432–43. doi:10.1080/1057610X.2012.675550.
- Cohen, Shuki J. (2016). "Mapping the Minds of Suicide Bombers using Linguistic Methods: The Corpus of Palestinian Suicide Bombers' Farewell Letters (CoPSBFL)". Studies in Conflict & Terrorism. 39 (7–8): 749–780. doi:10.1080/1057610X.2016.1141005.
- Fierke, K.M. (2009). "Agents of death: the structural logic of suicide terrorism and martyrdom". International Theory. 1 (171): 155–184. doi:10.1017/S1752971909000049.
- Ganor, Boaz (2015). Global Alert: The Rationality of Modern Islamist Terrorism and the Challenge to the Liberal Democratic World. New York: Columbia University Press. ISBN 978-0-231-53891-6.
- Ganor, Boaz (2021). Israel's Counterterrorism Strategy: Origins to the Present. Columbia University Press. ISBN 978-0-231-55300-1.
- Ginges, Jeremy; Atran, Scott (2008). "Humiliation and the Inertia Effect: Implications for Understanding Violence and Compromise in Intractable Intergroup Conflicts". Journal of Cognition and Culture. 8 (3–4): 281–294. doi:10.1163/156853708X358182. ISSN 1567-7095.
- Gupta, Dipak K.; Mundra, Kusum (2005). "Suicide Bombing as a Strategic Weapon: An Empirical Investigation of Hamas and Islamic Jihad". Studies in Conflict & Terrorism. 17 (4): 573–598. doi:10.1080/09546550500189895.
- Halder, Radhika (2020). Understanding Suicide Terrorism. London and New York: Routledge. ISBN 978-1-003-00611-4.
- Hassan, Riaz (2011). Suicide Bombings. London: Routledge. ISBN 978-0-415-58887-4.
- Hatina, Meir (2014). Martyrdom in Modern Islam: Piety, Power, and Politics. Cambridge University Press. ISBN 978-1-107-47782-7.
- Hoffman, Bruce (2017). Inside Terrorism. Columbia Studies in Terrorism and Irregular Warfare (3rd ed.). Cambridge University Press. doi:10.7312/hoff17476. ISBN 978-0-231-54489-4.
- Horowitz, Michael C. (2015). "The Rise and Spread of Suicide Bombing". Annual Review of Political Science. 18 (18): 69–84. doi:10.1146/annurev-polisci-062813-051049.
- Husain, Mir Zohair (2021). "Muslims and Terrorism". Handbook of Contemporary Islam and Muslim Lives. Cham: Springer International Publishing. pp. 1133–1149. doi:10.1007/978-3-030-32626-5_34. ISBN 978-3-030-32625-8.
- Khashan, Hilal (2003). "Collective Palestinian frustration and suicide bombings". Third World Quarterly. 24 (6): 1049–1067. doi:10.1080/01436590310001630062. ISSN 0143-6597.
- Kliot, Nurit; Charney, Igal (2006). "The geography of suicide terrorism in Israel". GeoJournal. 66 (4): 353–373. Bibcode:2006GeoJo..66..353K. doi:10.1007/s10708-006-9034-z.
- Litvak, Meir (2010). ""Martyrdom is Life": Jihad and Martyrdom in the Ideology of Hamas". Studies in Conflict & Terrorism. 33 (8): 716–734. doi:10.1080/1057610X.2010.494170.
- Merari, Ariel; Fighel, Jonathan; Ganor, Boaz; Lavie, Ephraim; Tzoreff, Yohanan; Livne, Arie (2010). "Making Palestinian "Martyrdom Operations"/"Suicide Attacks": Interviews With Would-Be Perpetrators and Organizers". Terrorism and Political Violence. 22 (22): 102–119. doi:10.1080/09546550903409403.
- Midlarsky, Manus I. (2004). "Nihilism in Political Chaos: Himmler, bin Laden, and Altruistic Punishment". Studies in Conflict & Terrorism. 27 (3): 187–206. doi:10.1080/10576100490438246.
- Moghadam, Assaf (2003). "Palestinian Suicide Terrorism in the Second Intifada: Motivations and Organizational Aspects". Studies in Conflict & Terrorism. 26 (2): 65–92. doi:10.1080/10576100390145215.
- Moghadam, Assaf (2006a). "The roots of suicide terrorism. A multi-causal approach". In Pedahzur, Ami (ed.). Root Causes of Suicide Terrorism. New York: Routledge. pp. 81–107. ISBN 978-0-415-77029-3.
- Moghadam, Assaf (2006b). "Suicide Terrorism, Occupation, and the Globalization of Martyrdom: A Critique of Dying to Win". Studies in Conflict & Terrorism. 29 (8): 707–729. doi:10.1080/10576100600561907. ISSN 1057-610X.
- Nanninga, Pieter (2019). Islam and Suicide Attacks. Elements in Religion and Violence. Cambridge University Press. ISBN 978-1-108-71265-1.
- Pape, Robert A. (2003). "The Strategic Logic of Suicide Terrorism". American Political Science Review. 97 (3). doi:10.1017/S000305540300073X. hdl:1811/31746. ISSN 0003-0554.
- Pape, Robert (2005). Dying to Win. The Strategic Logic of Suicide Terrorism. Random House. ISBN 978-1-58836-460-9.
- Pavet de Courteille, Abel (1975). Mirâdj-nâmeh: récit de l'ascension de Mahomet au ciel, composé a.h. 840 (1436/1437), texte turk-oriental, publié pour la première fois d'après le manuscript ouïgour de la Bibliothèque nationale et traduit en français, avec une préf. analytique et historique, des notes, et des extraits du Makhzeni Mir Haïder (in French). Amsterdam, Netherlands: Philo Press. ISBN 978-90-6022-255-3.
- Pedahzur, Ami, ed. (2006). Root Causes of Suicide Terrorism: The Globalization of Martyrdom. New York: Routledge. ISBN 978-0415770309.
- Pedahzur, Ami; Perliger, Arie; Weinberg, Leonard (2003). "Altruism and fatalism: the characteristics of Palestinian suicide terrorists". Deviant Behavior. 24 (4): 405–423. doi:10.1080/713840227.
- Pisoiu, Daniela; Hain, Sandra (2018). Theories of Terrorism. Abingdon, Oxon; New York, NY: Routledge. ISBN 978-0-415-82607-5.
- Siniver, Asaf, ed. (2023). Routledge Companion to the Israeli-Palestinian Conflict. Abingdon and New York: Routledge. ISBN 978-1-032-24901-8.
- Soibelman, Mali (2004). "Palestinian Suicide Bombers". Journal of Investigative Psychology and Offender Profiling. 1 (3): 175–190. doi:10.1002/jip.16.
- Thomas, Jakana L. (2021). "Wolves in Sheep's Clothing: Assessing the Effect of Gender Norms on the Lethality of Female Suicide Terrorism". International Theory. 75 (3): 769–802. doi:10.1017/S0020818321000035.

=== Newspapers and magazines ===
- Fabian, Emanuel (19 August 2024). "Hamas claims Tel Aviv blast as attempted suicide bombing, vows to carry out more". The Times of Israel. ISSN 0040-7909.
- Lidman, Melanie (19 August 2024). "Palestinian militants claim Tel Aviv bombing that wounded 1". AP News.
- McGreal, Chris (14 January 2004). "Human-bomb mother kills four Israelis at Gaza checkpoint". The Guardian.
- Mpoke Bigg, Matthew; Sobelman, Gabby (19 August 2024). "Hamas and Islamic Jihad Claim Responsibility for Tel Aviv Bombing". The New York Times.
- "'Return to martyrdom': Hamas official instructs Palestinian terrorists to return to suicide bombing". Jerusalem Post. 29 August 2024.
