= Hilal =

Hilal or Al-Hilal may refer to:

- Hilal (Islam) (Arabic: هلال, hilāl, a crescent), the first visible crescent of the New Moon (q.v.), used to determine the beginning of a month in the lunar Hijri ("Islamic") calendar
- Banu Hilal, a confederation of tribes of Arabia

== Arts and entertainment ==
- Al Hilal (film), a 1935 Urdu/Hindi costume drama film
- Al-Hilal (newspaper), a weekly Urdu newspaper 1912–1914
- Al-Hilal (magazine), a monthly Egyptian cultural and literature magazine

== Businesses and organizations ==
- Al Hilal Bank, an Islamic bank in Abu Dhabi, United Arab Emirates
- Al-Hilal Stadium, a multi-use stadium in Omdurman, Sudan
- Al-Hilal English School, Manki, a not-for-profit school in Manki, Karnataka, India
- Red Crescent (emblem) (al-hilal al-ahmar), a symbol of the International Red Cross and Red Crescent Movement

== People ==
- Hilal (given name)
- Hilal (surname)

== Places ==
- Al Hilal (district), a district of Doha, Qatar
- Hilal (İzmir Metro), a metro station in İzmir
- Hilal, Uludere, town and municipality of Turkish Kurdistan

== Sports ==
=== Football ===
==== Men Teams ====
- Al Hilal SFC, a Saudi Arabian professional multi-sports club
- Al Hilal SCSC (Benghazi), a Libyan club
- Al Hilal Club (Omdurman), a Sudanese club
- Al Hilal ESC (Al-Fasher), a Sudanese club
- Al Hilal SC (Kadougli), a Sudanese club
- Al Hilal FC (Juba), a South Sudanese club
- Al Hilal FC (Wau), a South Sudanese club
- Al Hilal Al Sahili, a Yemeni club
- El Hilal SC El Obeid, a Sudanese club
- Hilal Alsahil SC, a Sudanese club
- Qamishli Sport, a Syrian club previously known as Al-Hilal

=== Basketball ===
==== Men Teams ====
- Al Hilal (basketball), a Saudi Arabian professional basketball club

== See also ==
- Hilaly
- Hilal-i-Imtiaz, a Pakistani award
- Hilal-i-Jur'at, a Pakistani award
- Al Hilaliya, place in Sudan
- Badr (disambiguation) ("full moon")
