= Hilal (given name) =

Hilal is a given name. People with the name include:

== Given name ==
- Hilal ibn Ali (632–684), one of the sons of Ali
- Hilal Altınbilek (born 1991), Turkish actress and model
- Hilal Asadov (1908–?), Azerbaijani-Soviet statesman
- Hilal Avcı (born 1996), Turkish female canoeist
- Hilal Başkol (born 1995), Turkish football player
- Hilal Cebeci (born 1976), Turkish pop singer
- Hilal Çetinkaya (born 1997), Turkish football player
- Hilal Elver (born 1953), Turkish academic
- Hilal El-Helwe (born 1994), Lebanese football player
- Hilal Hilal (born 1966), Syrian politician
- Hilal Hemed Hilal (born 1994), Tanzanian swimmer
- Hilal Hussain, Pakistani military officer
- Hilal Khashan (born 1951), Palestinian-American scholar
- Hilal Mammadov (born 1959), Azerbaijani journalist
- Hilal Ben Moussa (born 1992), Dutch-Moroccan football player
- Hilal Musa (born 1990), Palestinian football player
- Hilal Naqvi (born 1950), Pakistani poet
- Hilal Ahmed Rather, Indian military officer
- Hilal al-Sabi' (969–1056), historian, bureaucrat, and writer of Arabic
- Hilal bin Ali Al Sabti (born 1972), Omani physician
- Hilal Saeed (born 1982), Emirati football player
- Hilal Tuba Tosun Ayer (born 1970), Turkish football referee

== Middle name ==
- Feride Hilal Akın (born 1996), Turkish musician

== See also ==
- Hilal (surname)
