= Hilal (surname) =

Hilal is a surname. Notable people with the surname include:

- Annabella Hilal (born 1986), Lebanese model
- Eshan Hilal, Indian dancer
- Hilal Hilal (born 1966), Syrian politician
- Hilal Hemed Hilal (born 1994), Tanzanian swimmer
- Muhammad Ghunaymi Hilal (1917–1968), Egyptian scholar and literary critic
- Musa Hilal (born 1961), Sudanese tribal chief and militia leader
- Nidal Hilal, British academic
- Paul Hilal, American businessman and investor
- Qutbuddin Hilal (born 1952), Afghan politician
- Sadek Hilal (1930–2000), American radiologist
- Sameer Hilal (born 1967), Saudi Arabian football player

== See also ==
- Hilal (given name)
