= Assaf Moghadam =

Israeli academic

Prof. Assaf Moghadam
- אסף מוגדם

Academic work
- Era: Late Cold War and Palestinian Uprisings.
- Discipline: counterterrorism
- Institutions: Israel and the United States

Assaf Moghadam (Hebrew: אסף מוגדם) is an academic with appointments in both Israel and the United States. He writes about political violence and counterterrorism in Asia and the North Atlantic region.

== Appointments ==
- Lauder School of Government, Diplomacy & Strategy, Reichman University, Israel.
- Nonresident fellow at the Combating Terrorism Center (CTC) at West Point.
- The Washington Institute "outside author".

== Writings ==
=== Books and chapters ===
- Moghadam, Assaf (2006). The roots of terrorism. New York: Infobase Publishing.
- Moghadam, Assaf (2006). "The roots of suicide terrorism. A multi-causal approach". In Pedahzur, Ami (ed.). Root Causes of Suicide Terrorism. New York: Routledge. pp. 81–107.
- Moghadam, Assaf (2017). Nexus of Global Jihad: Understanding Cooperation among Terrorist Actors. Columbia University Press.
- Moghadam, Assaf (August 2003). "A Global Resurgence of Religion?". Paper No. 03-03 (PDF). Weatherhead Center for International Affairs, Harvard University.

=== Journal articles ===
- Koch, Ariel; Nahon, Karine; Moghadam, Assaf (5 July 2023). "White Jihad: How White Supremacists Adopt Jihadi Narratives, Aesthetics, and Tactics". Terrorism and Political Violence. 36 (7): 919–943. doi:10.1080/09546553.2023.2223694. ISSN 0954-6553.
- Moghadam, Assaf (2003). "Palestinian Suicide Terrorism in the Second Intifada: Motivations and Organizational Aspects". Studies in Conflict & Terrorism. 26 (2): 65–92. doi:10.1080/10576100390145215.
- Moghadam, Assaf (2006b). "Suicide Terrorism, Occupation, and the Globalization of Martyrdom: A Critique of Dying to Win". Studies in Conflict & Terrorism. 29 (8): 707–729. doi:10.1080/10576100600561907. ISSN 1057-610X.

=== Papers ===
- "Say Terrorist, Think Insurgent: Labeling and Analyzing Contemporary Terrorist Actors". START.umd.edu.

== See also ==
- Counterinsurgency
- Counterterrorism
- Palestinian suicide attacks
- Israel–United States relations
- Public diplomacy of Israel
- White jihad
- War on terror
