= Battle of Rafah (2009) =

Conflict between Hamas and Jund Ansar Allah in the Gaza Strip

- Part of the Salafi-jihadist insurgency in the Gaza Strip
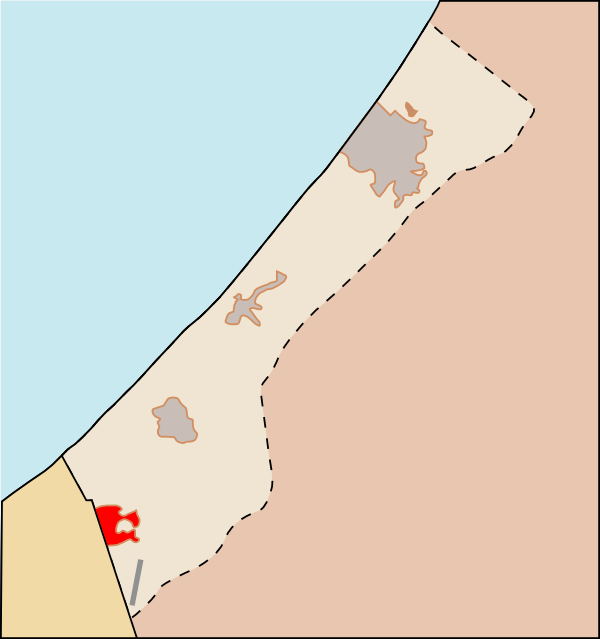
- Location of Rafah in the Gaza Strip
Date	14–15 August 2009 (1 day)
Location	Ibn Taymiyyah mosque, Rafah Governorate, Gaza Strip, Palestine
Result	Hamas government victory
Territorial changes	Destruction of the self-proclaimed Islamic Emirate of Rafah

Belligerents
Islamic Emirate of Rafah	(Palestine) Hamas Government

Commanders and leaders
Abdel Latif Moussa †; Abu Abdullah al-Suri †	Khaled Mashal; Ismail Haniyeh; Abu Jibril Shimali †

Units involved
(Jund Ansar Allah#Islamic Emirate of Rafah) Jund Ansar Allah	(Hamas) Izz ad-Din al-Qassam Brigades; (Hamas) Rafah Brigade; Palestinian Security Services; Palestinian Police

Strength
100+ militants	(Hamas) Unknown

Casualties and losses
15 militants killed 40 militants arrested	6 police officers killed
- (Palestine) 5 Palestinian civilians killed (Palestine) 150 Palestinian civilians wounded

The Battle of Rafah (2009) took place between Hamas and Jund Ansar Allah in the Rafah Governorate of the Gaza Strip. Fighting between the two Palestinian militant organizations broke out on 14 August 2009, when Jund Ansar Allah's founder Abdel Latif Moussa denounced the Hamas government for supposedly failing to enforce Islamic law and for "not being any different from a secular government" since it ousted Fatah during the Battle of the Gaza Strip in June 2007. He subsequently proclaimed the establishment of the Islamic Emirate of Rafah and swore allegiance to al-Qaeda. In total, 26 people were killed and 150 were wounded during the conflict, including an 11-year-old Palestinian girl. Moussa was killed in Rafah on 15 August 2009, triggering the collapse of Jund Ansar Allah and the Islamic Emirate of Rafah.

== Events ==
A day before the Hamas raid, Jund Ansar Allah leader, Abdel Latif Moussa, declared the Islamic Emirate of Rafah, and swore allegiance to Al-Qaeda. About 100 of his fighters were seen in a video where he pledged allegiance in his base, a mosque in Rafah. The next day, the Qassam Brigades attacked the mosque and other bases of the group in Rafah. The fighting lasted 7 hours. It was reported that when Hamas reached the positions of Moussa and Jund Ansar Allah's military commander, Abu Abdullah al Suri, they detonated themselves. About 15 Jund Ansar Allah fighters were killed, 40 were captured, 5 civilians were killed. Al-Qassam brigades commander Abu Jibril Shimali, was also killed during the battle. The group was virtually destroyed after the fighting, having both of its leaders killed, and its bases captured. It was reported that Hamas later released some of the captured.

== See also ==
- Islamist anti-Hamas groups in the Gaza Strip
- Islamism in the Gaza Strip
- Palestinian nationalism
- Palestinian suicide attacks
- Islam and nationalism
