= Hilaly =

Hilaly (Urdu: هلالی; Arabic: الهلالي) is an Asian surname. Notable people with the surname include:

- Aeshi Hilaly (born 1973), Tanzanian politician
- Agha Hilaly (1911–2001), Pakistani diplomat
- Ahmed Naguib el-Hilaly (1891–1958), Egyptian lawyer and educator
- Shamim Hilaly (born 1947), Pakistani actress
- Taj El-Din Hilaly (1941–2023), Australian Sunni Muslim leader
- Zafar Hilaly (born 1942), Pakistani political analyst and diplomat

== See also ==
- Hilal
- Hila (given name)
- Madrasa Sirajul Uloom Hilali Sarai Sambhal
