= Ideology of Palestinian Islamic Jihad =

The main objective of Palestinian Islamic Jihad (PIJ) is to destroy the Israeli state. PIJ seeks to achieve this through military action. Their objective is informed by their historical understanding of the current situation and their religious beliefs and interpretations of the Quran.

== Anti-imperialism and pan-Islamism ==
PIJ’s ideology is influenced by both anti-imperialism and pan-Islamism, amongst other things. PIJ view the Israeli state as both an occupying power and a colonial power which must be dismantled. They believe that the Arab–Israeli conflict has its roots not in 1948 and the emergence of the Israeli state, but rather in Western imperialism and its destructive effect on Islamic unity. More specifically, PIJ believe that Western powers aimed to divide Islamic societies and communities to upkeep Western hegemony in the region after the dissolution of the Ottoman Empire. PIJ view the Israeli state as an extension and mechanism of Western hegemony, contributing to the oppression of the local population and constituting a major cause of division, conflict and instability in the region and the Global South more generally. They therefore think that the destruction of the Israeli state is not only important for ending the occupation of Palestinian land and the suppression of the Palestinian people, but also important for the decolonization of the broader region and the revival of Muslim unity. Because PIJ view Israel as a colonial power and a dividing force between Muslims, they believe that liberating Palestine through the destruction of the Israeli state should be a major concern of all Islamic movements or groups. In line with their belief in the importance of Muslim unity, PIJ emphasise the commonalities of Shia Islam and Sunni Islam, rather than their differences.

According to Alavi, Ayatollah Khomeini and the Islamic Revolution in Iran strongly influenced the ideology of PIJ's founder Fathi Shaqaqi and, by extension, that of Palestinian Islamic Jihad. Alavi argues that Shaqaqi’s ideas regarding the importance of Islamic movements and Islamic unity for freeing the region from Western domination and colonization stemmed from Khomeini. Accordingly, Shaqaqi viewed the Iranian revolution as a breakthrough in the fight for decolonization and, according to Alavi, pro-Iranian sentiment is still central to PIJ today. Alavi also argues that the relationship with and support (including financial support) b Iran are the main reasons PIJ was able to extend its influence and activity beyond Israel and the Occupied Palestinian Territories.

== Views on Israel and Hamas ==
PIJ firmly views Israel as a colonial entity which contributes to oppression in the Global South, and thus opposes the two-state solution. In fact, some Palestinians joined PIJ, and not Hamas, because Hamas accepted the two-state solution. Hatina highlights, however, that PIJ believe that, after the destruction of the Israeli state, Jews and Muslims would be able to live together under Islamic rule.

The ideologies of Hamas and PIJ began diverging after the First Intifada. Hamas began to incorporate international law into its ideology (alongside Islam), while PIJ did not. Another difference between PIJ and Hamas is that the latter participates in democratic elections.

== Interpretations of the Quran ==
According to the interpretation of the Quran by Fathi Shaqaqi, the region of Palestine is especially blessed as it is connect to many verses of the Quran. Shaqaqi also made some commentary on the Israeli occupation being prophesied by the Quran but did not devote much of his work to it. Nevertheless he believed that the eventual liberation of Palestine was prophesied in the Quran (in the first verses of surah isra). Shaqaqi believed that as the Israelites had been defeated historically, so once again Palestinians would be liberated. PIJ thus believe that the liberation of Palestine is God’s will and that it is every Muslim’s duty to fight for this, making immediate military resistance imperative.

== See also ==
- Islamic Jihad Movement in Palestine
- Fathi Shaqaqi
- Arab–Israeli conflict
- Israeli–Palestinian conflict
