= Muhammad Ghunaymi Hilal =

Egyptian scholar and literary critic

Muhammad Ghunaymi Hilal (Arabic: محمد غنيمي هلال)
- Born: 1917
- Died: 1968 (aged 50–51)
- Education: University of Paris (PhD)
- Scientific career
- Fields: literary criticism, comparative literature

Muhammad Ghunaymi Hilal (1917–1968) was an Egyptian scholar and literary critic. He is credited as the founder of Arabic comparative literature. Hilal is best known for his influential book Adab Al-Muqāran.
