= Jund Ansar Allah =

Palestinian militant organization (2008–2009)

- جند أنصار الله
- Leaders: Abdel Latif Moussa †; Abu Abdullah al Suri †
- Dates active: November 2008 – 15 August 2009
- Allegiance: Al-Qaeda (Alleged); Islamic Emirate of Rafah
- Headquarters: Rafah, Gaza Strip
- Ideology: Salafi jihadism
- Size: 100+

Jund Ansar Allah (Arabic: جند أنصار الله, romanized: Jund ʾAnṣār Allāh, lit. 'Army of the Supporters of God', abbr. JAA) was an armed Palestinian Salafi-jihadist organization operating in the Gaza Strip. It was founded in November 2008 by Sheikh Abdel Latif Moussa. On 14 August 2009, Moussa announced the establishment of the Islamic Emirate of Rafah in the Gaza Strip. The group criticized the ruling power, Hamas, for failing to enforce Sharia law. In response, Hamas attacked the organization, resulting in 24 people killed and a further 150 wounded. The group disbanded after the battle.

== Establishment ==
Jund Ansar Allah was established in November 2008 by Sheikh Abdel Latif Moussa, who had headed a Salafi organization in Gaza since the 1980's, and Khalid Banat (Abu Abdullah Suri), who claimed to have fought with leading al-Qaeda figures including Osama bin Laden and Abu Musab al-Zarqawi.

Jund Ansar Allah was an organization ideologically affiliated with the movement for global jihad. Moussa, an "Egyptian-educated physician-turned-cleric," was the group's spiritual leader. He left his medical practice in Rafah to become one of the most influential preachers in the southern Gaza Strip.

== Armed activities ==
On 8 June 2009 the group carried out a raid on the Karni border crossing between the Gaza Strip and Israel. Ten individuals from the group rode into battle on horses laden with large quantities of explosives, with at least three of them being shot dead by Israeli troops. Five Jund Ansar Allah operatives in total died in the operation. Israeli officials said several of the men had been wearing explosive belts, and suspected they had been attempting to kidnap a soldier.

The organization also clashed with Hamas. On 22 July 2009, three Jund Ansar Allah militants holed up in a building in Khan Yunis surrendered in a standoff with Hamas police. Hamas officials also blamed the group for the bombings of several internet cafes, seen as a source of immorality, and of a wedding party attended by relatives of the West Bank-based Fatah leader, Mohammed Dahlan, in which fifty people were injured. Jund Ansar Allah denied any responsibility for the latter attack, and Fatah leaders blamed Hamas. In August 2009, a senior Hamas official told The Jerusalem Post that Jund Ansar Allah received its weapons from former Fatah policemen and security officials in the southern Gaza Strip and that the aim of its attacks were to "defame" Hamas. On 14 August 2009, the Izz ad-Din al-Qassam Brigades attacked the Ibn Taymiyyah mosque in Rafah and other bases in Rafah. The fighting lasted 7 hours. It was reported that when Hamas reached the positions of Moussa and Abu Abdullah al Suri, they detonated themselves. About 13 Jund Ansar Allah fighters were killed, 40 were captured, 5 civilians were killed, including 6 Hamas militants. al-Qassam brigades commander Abu Jibril Shimali, was also killed during the battle. The group was virtually destroyed after the fighting, having both of its leaders killed, and its bases captured. It was reported that Hamas later released some of the captured.

== Islamic Emirate of Rafah ==
The Islamic Emirate of Rafah (Arabic: إِمَارَةُ رَفَحُ ٱلْإِسْلَامِيَّةْ), founded by Jund Ansar Allah, was a short-lived unrecognized Islamic state located in Rafah. It was founded when they declared independence in 2009, two years after the Hamas takeover of Gaza. It collapsed after the 2009 Battle of Rafah. On Friday, 14 August 2009, the leader of Jund Ansar Allah, Abdel Latif Moussa, unexpectedly declared the creation of an Islamic emirate in the Gaza Strip before 100 of his armed followers at the Ibn Taymiyyah mosque in Rafah after the Friday prayer sermon. During his sermon, the Salafist Moussa condemned the nationalist-Islamist Hamas for failing to implement proper Sharia law and "not being any different from a Secular government".

=== Collapse ===
Regarding the sermon as a challenge to their governance of the Gaza Strip, Hamas forces surrounded the mosque and demanded those inside to surrender. Exchanges of gunfire erupted into a seven-hour battle in which Hamas fighters sealed off the entire neighbourhood and fired rocket-propelled grenades at the mosque. During the firefight, 24 Palestinians were killed and more than 130 injured. The dead included twelve Jund Ansar Allah members, six Hamas members and six civilians, including three young children aged 8, 10 and 13. An Egyptian National Security Agency official said a three-year-old boy from Egypt, across the Egypt–Gaza border, was critically wounded by a bullet which reached him from the fighting in Gaza. A Hamas fighter later went to Moussa's house to arrest him, and Moussa killed himself and the Hamas fighter by detonating his suicide belt after being cornered. His house was rigged with explosives by Hamas forces. Abu-Jibril Shimali, head of Hamas' Izz ad-Din al-Qassam Brigades in the southern Gaza Strip, died in the fighting. Israel believes that Shimali orchestrated the abduction of Israeli soldier Gilad Shalit in a June 2006 cross-border raid. Hamas did not permit media coverage of the event, barring journalists from entering Rafah or interviewing the wounded.

=== Aftermath ===
Following the clashes, a number of Al-Qaeda-affiliated Salafi jihadist groups condemned Hamas as an apostate movement that committed "massacre" and stated that Hamas' actions was made to "serve the interest of the Israeli settlers of Palestine and the Christians who are persecuting Muslims in Afghanistan, Chechnya, Iraq, and Somalia". The anti-Hamas sentiment among Salafists was carried on by ISG.

Websites associated with Fatah later released cellphone footage of what appeared to be Hamas executing Jund Ansar Allah fighters during the clash. The video showed Hamas militants gathering several Jund Ansar Allah fighters in the courtyard of the Mosque, and then mowing them down in a fierce burst of gunfire. Some of the Jund Ansar Allah men were shown lying motionless and bleeding on the ground. In two scenes, Hamas militants appeared to be shooting captives execution-style at close range, and bodies were seen falling to the ground. In another scene, a group of Jund Ansar Allah captives were seen standing motionless against a wall a few meters away. Israeli Channel 10 also broadcast a recording of what it said was the Hamas military communication channel, ordering Hamas forces to execute everyone. There was no immediate comment from Hamas officials. However, Hamas had previously denied that an execution took place at the site, or that members of Jund Ansar Allah were "massacred."

The last known attack by remmants of Jund Ansar Allah was a bombing of the French cultural center in Gaza on 11 December 2014.

=== Reactions ===
Following the battle, Jund Ansar Allah vowed to attack Hamas compounds and pro-Hamas mosques in revenge. On 29 August, bombs exploded inside a security compound and near a Hamas-affiliated mosque in Gaza City, according to security officials. Nobody was injured in the attacks. Jund Ansar al-Jihad wal Sunna, a previously unknown group, claimed responsibility for the attack, declaring: "We urge our jihadist brothers to join forces to conduct painful joint warfare against those miscreant murtadeen [Hamas] and end their reign." Associated Press said that "the two explosions appear[ed] to be revenge attacks against Gaza's Hamas rulers," and suggested a link with Jund Ansar Allah.

== Ideology ==
On its website, the group says it has vowed to God to "fight a jihad for his sake" until the "banner of unity is hoisted" and Muhammad "is made victorious". Then on Friday, Jund Ansar Allah announced on its website and jihadist forums its allegiance to the "Islamic emirate in the heart of Beit al-Maqdis [Jerusalem]". The website also stated on the day of the clash with Hamas stated:

The soldiers of Tawhid [unification] will not rest ... until all Muslim lands are liberated and until our imprisoned al-Aqsa [mosque] is purified from the desecration of the accursed Jews.

Jund Ansar Allah also demanded that Hamas "cease its aggression against Salafis" and warned of a confrontation if security forces interfered.

== See also ==
- Army of Islam (Gaza)
- Jahafil Al-Tawhid Wal-Jihad fi Filastin
- Islamist anti-Hamas groups in the Gaza Strip
- Islamic Emirate of Kunar
- Islamic Emirate of Kurdistan
- Islamic Emirate of Afghanistan
- Islamic Wilayaat of Somalia
