= Nidal Hilal =

British engineering scientist

Professor Nidal Hilal - DSc, PhD, Euro Ing, CEng, FIChemE, FLSW, FRSC

Nidal Hilal (Arabic: نضال هلال) is an academic and engineering scientist known for his work in water research and membrane technology. He is a Global Network Professor at New York University and the principal investigator of NYUAD Water Research Center. Hilal previously held professorships at the University of Nottingham and Swansea University. He is an emeritus professor of engineering at Swansea University and the founding director of the Centre for Water Advanced Technologies and Environmental Research (CWATER).

== Education ==
Hilal received his bachelor's degree in chemical engineering in 1981 followed by a period of experience in the oil industry. In 1983, he moved to United Kingdom to pursue postgraduate studies at Swansea University, graduating with a Master of Science in advanced chemical engineering in 1985 and a Doctor of Philosophy in chemical engineering in 1988. He later earned a Postgraduate Certificate in Higher Education from the University of Nottingham in 2002. In recognition of his outstanding lifetime research contributions to the field of Water Process Engineering, the University of Wales awarded him a Doctor of Science (DSc) degree in 2005.

== Career ==
Hilal began his academic career at the University of Nottingham, where he served as a lecturer in chemical engineering from 2001 to 2003 and was subsequently promoted to reader in chemical and process engineering. In December 2005, he was appointed chair professor of chemical and process engineering at the School of Chemical, Environmental and Mining Engineering, a position he held until August 2010. He then joined Swansea University as chair professor of water process engineering, where he founded the Centre for Water Advanced Technologies and Environmental Research (CWATER) and served as head of chemical and environmental engineering. Hilal joined New York University as a Global Network Professor and the principal investigator at NYU Abu Dhabi Water Research Center.

== Honors and awards ==
Hilal has been listed among the Highly Cited Researchers by Clarivate in 2022 and 2024. According to Google Scholar metrics, he has been ranked first worldwide in the fields of nanofiltration and membrane distillation, second in reverse osmosis, and among the top 10 global leaders in desalination research. He was also awarded, by the Emir of Kuwait, the prestigious Kuwait Prize (Kuwait Medal) of Applied Science for the year 2005 and Menelaus Medal 2020, by the Learned Society of Wales, for excellence in engineering and technology. In 2024 he was awarded the GPID - Global Prize Innovation in Desalination Award in the category of Advanced Water Production Technologies. Hilal is appointed a Special Advisor to the International Desalination and Water Reuse Association-IDRA.

== Research ==
Hilal has authored more than 600 publications, including several patents and books. His research focuses on developing innovative, cost-effective solutions in nano-water science, membrane technology, and water treatment—spanning desalination, colloid engineering, and nano-engineering applications of atomic force microscopy (AFM). Hilal’s pioneering work has advanced the use of AFM in designing and optimizing membranes for complex separations. His key contributions include developing the smallest AFM colloid probe reported in the literature, introducing the AFM coated colloid and cell probe techniques, and achieving the first direct measurements of interactions between single live cells and membrane surfaces, as well as adhesion forces between individual particles and membranes. His team also identified pores on nanofiltration membranes, applied AFM in meso-scale cavitation studies and membrane development, and created composite imprinted and self-cleaning membranes for sustainable desalination. Additional achievements include research on the use of saline water for agriculture and the development of the first industrial-scale reverse osmosis (RO) module in the United Arab Emirates.

== Books ==
Hilal has published 12 handbooks on water treatment, osmosis engineering, membrane technology, and related engineering fields.
