= Al Hilal English School, Manki =

Coordinates: 14.19635°N 74.47666°E

Al Hilal English School
- Manki, Karnataka; India

Information
- Type: English school
- Motto: Rabbi zidni ilman-naf'ia
- Established: 1989
- Founder: Late Mr. Sawood Hajika
- Authority: Government of Karnataka
- Head of school: A H M Mujawar
- Grades: Class Lkg - X
- Enrollment: 450 approx.
- Campus size: 10 acres (40,000 m^{2})
- Colors: sea green and light green
- Website: alhilaleducation.com

Al-Hilal English School is a not-for-profit school in Manki, Honnavar, which was founded in 1989 by Shabandri Iqbal, Shabandri Jaffar Sadik, and Sawood Hajika, and managed by Tarbiat Education Society. The school started off as a private venture but eventually, partial control was passed to the government. It covers ages 3–18.

== History ==
The school was started with just a block accommodating Lower Kindergarten and Upper Kindergarten. The school was a success and soon, the number of students increased dramatically. This demanded a bigger campus which was expanded over the years in line with the increasing population. Presently it is having L.K.G. to 10th STD, and is all set to have its block for pre-university college within the campus.

The population of Manki is 11,000, but the people are lagging behind in educational opportunities compared to surrounding places such as Bhatkal, Honnavara, and Murudeshwara. That changed when the school was established.

== Present strength ==
The present strength of the school is around 450 students. Since its establishment, more than 200 have graduated.

== Buildings and grounds ==
The school owns the land for further expansion. It includes a school building of around 8000 sq ft, a playground, a mosque, and a residential building for teachers.
