= Hilal Ahmed Rather =

Indian Air Force officer

Hilal Ahmed Rather VM VSM
- Military career
- Allegiance: India
- Branch: Indian Air Force
- Service years: 1988-2025
- Rank: Air Vice Marshal
- Nicknames: "Hally" "Rafale Man"
- Service number: 19863
- Commands: AFS Gwalior
- Conflicts: 2016 Indian Line of Control strike
- Awards: Vayu Sena Medal; Vishisht Seva Medal

Air Vice Marshal Hilal Ahmed Rather VM, VSM is a retired Indian Air Force air vice marshal from Kashmir in India. Since 2016, he served as the Indian air attaché in Paris, and organized the supply of the Dassault Rafale to the Indian Air Force.

== Career ==
A native of southern Kashmir's Anantnag district, Rather studied at the Sainik School Nagrota near Jammu from Class VI in 1978. According to family friends, he rarely visited his home following the beginning of the insurgency in 1988.

Rather was commissioned into the regular (flying) branch of the IAF as a pilot officer on 17 December 1988, with the service number 19863, He passed out from the Air Force Academy at Dundigal as the "Best All-Round Pilot", winning both the President's Plaque and the academy Sword of Honor. He was promoted flying officer on 17 December 1989 and flight lieutenant on 17 December 1993. Rather was promoted squadron leader on 17 December 1999, and went on a flight safety course in Bangladesh in 2003. Rather also attended the Defence Services Staff College (DSSC) at Wellington. He was promoted wing commander on 16 December 2004 and group captain on 1 May 2010. He also served as an instructor at the DSSC.

In 2011, Rather was selected for a course at the USAF Air War College, which he passed with distinction. After completing the course, he returned to India in 2013 and was posted to the AHQ (Air Headquarters) of the Western Air Command. From 2013 to 2016, Rather served as director of fighter operations for the Western Air Command, with responsibility for training and operational plans. Commanding AFS Gwalior, Rather was involved in the September 2016 Indian Line of Control strike. On 26 December 2016, he was promoted air commodore.

As defense air attaché in Paris, Rather is one of only four IAF officers in this role; the others are posted at the Indian missions in the U.S., the U.K. and Russia. He has over 3,000 accident-free flight hours on Dassault Mirage 2000, MiG-21 and Kiran aircraft. He was promoted to acting air vice marshal in 2021, and was promoted to the substantive rank on 12 January 2023 with seniority from 1 September 2021.

== Awards ==
Rather received the Vayu Sena Medal (VM) for devotion to duty in 2010, followed by the Vishisht Seva Medal in 2016.

Vayu Sena Medal	Vishisht Seva Medal

== Personal life ==
AH Rather is the youngest of five siblings, including three sisters and 1 brother. His father was Muhammad Abdullah Rather SM (d. 2013), a decorated veteran of the 1962 Sino-Indian War who fought with the Jammu and Kashmir Light Infantry and who subsequently joined the J&K police, retiring as a deputy superintendent. His brother is a teacher in Anantnag, a chemistry lecturer, while his three elder sisters retired after careers in teaching and in the law; both his parents are deceased. He married his wife Samina in 1993, with whom he has two children.
