= Studies in Conflict & Terrorism =

- Discipline: Political science
- Language: English
- Edited by: Bruce Hoffman

Publication details
- Former name: Terrorism
- History: 1977–present
- Publisher: Taylor & Francis
- Frequency: Monthly
- Impact factor: 1.071 (2016)

Standard abbreviations
- ISO 4: Stud. Confl. Terror.

Indexing
- ISSN: 1057-610X (print); 1521-0731 (web)
- LCCN: 92656207
- OCLC no.: 321022477

Links
- Journal homepage; Online access; Online archive

Studies in Conflict & Terrorism is a monthly peer-reviewed academic journal covering research on terrorism and insurgency. It was established in 1977 as Terrorism, obtaining its current name in 1992 when Terrorism was merged with another journal titled Conflict. It is published by Taylor & Francis and the editor-in-chief is Bruce Hoffman (Georgetown University). The Editorial Board also includes Georgetown University Professor and author Ed Husain. According to the Journal Citation Reports, the journal has a 2016 impact factor of 1.071.
