= Abdel Latif Moussa =

Palestinian Salafi jihadist (1959–2009)

- Born: Abdel Latif Bin Khalid Al Moussa c. 1959; Gaza Strip
- Died: 15 August 2009; Rafah, Gaza Strip, Palestine
- Education: University of Alexandria's Faculty of Medicine
- Known for: Former leader of Jund Ansar Allah and Emir of the Islamic Emirate of Rafah

Abdel Latif Moussa, (Arabic: عبد اللطيف موسى) also known as Abu Noor al-Maqdisi (Arabic: أبو نور المقدسي), (born c. 1959 – 15 August 2009) was a Palestinian militant and leader of the Salafist Jihadist group Jund Ansar Allah (Arabic: جند أنصار الله), an Islamist group in Rafah, Gaza Strip. On 14 August 2009, he proclaimed the Islamic Emirate of Rafah in the Palestinian Territories and was killed the following day 15 August, when Hamas forces stormed his headquarters and residence.

== Early life and career ==
Born in the Gaza Strip. He was said to be fifty years old at the time of his death on 15 August 2009. He studied in the Gaza Strip education system, completing his secondary school education in the late 1970s where he was particularly noted for excellence the field of science.

In 1979 he joined the Faculty of Medicine of Alexandria University, where he went on to achieve a doctorate in family health. During this time, he also studied with a number of prominent Alexandrian Sheikhs including; Sheikh Said Abdul Azeem, Sheikh Mohamed Bin Ismail al-Muqaddim, Sheikh Ahmed Fareed, and Sheikh Hamd Ibrahim.

He later worked as a teacher for five years at the "Ahl Al Hadith Al Sharif Centre" which is affiliated to the "Jam'iyat Dar Al Kitab Wa Al Sunna [the Association of the Books and Traditions of the Prophet]", in the city of Khan Yunis in the Southern Gaza Strip.

He worked as a preacher for the "Ahl Al Sunnah" mosque in Khan Yunis for 15 years. Following this, he worked as the preacher for the Egyptian/Palestinian "Nour Ala Al Hadoud" mosque for a period of 18 months. After this mosque was destroyed by the Israeli Army in 2006, he became the preacher and imam of the "Sheikh al Islam Ibn Taymiyah" mosque until the time of his death. He also served as the Director of Medicine of the Rafah Martyrs Medical Centre.

He wrote a number of books including a book on the issue of faith entitled Al Yaqout Wa Al Morgan Fi Aqeeda Ahl Al Iman [The Ruby and Corral of the Faith of the Believers] and Al Tareeq Al Sawi Fi Iftiqah Asr Al Nabi [The Straight Way for Following the Way of the Prophet]. There are also a number of recording attributed to al-Maqdisi in which he explains the issue of faith.

He cemented his position as a mufti of international standing with his final book As'illa Wa Agwiba Sharia Hawl Al Qadiyah Al Filistaniyah (Juristic Questions and Answers Regarding the Palestinian Cause).

== Death ==
On 14 August 2009, Moussa proclaimed an "Islamic Emirate" in the Palestinian Territories. Early 15 August, Hamas police stormed his Ibn Taymiyah mosque in Rafah, and ended the rebellion. Moussa died in an explosion, officials said, but it was not clear whether he blew himself up. The mosque was destroyed in the fighting. The total death toll was 24.

== See also ==
- Islamist anti-Hamas groups in the Gaza Strip
