= Hilal Khashan =

- هلال خشان
- Born: Beirut, Lebanon
- Education: University of Florida; Florida State University
- Occupation: Academic

Hilal Khashan is a scholar of the Middle East.

His research focuses on Middle Eastern regional security, with emphasis on the Persian Gulf.

He is quoted in the international press as a commentator on Lebanese and regional politics. In recent publications, he has analyzed the alliance between Hezbollah and Maronite leader Michel Aoun, discussed Hezbollah's plans for Lebanon, and written about Saudi Arabia's Vision 2030 which in his opinion is "flawed".

== Books ==
- Hizbullah: A Mission to Nowhere. Lexington Books, 2019.
- Arab Attitudes Toward Israel and Peace. Washington, D.C.: The Washington Institute for Near East Policy, Policy Focus Series no. 40, 2000. Translated into Hebrew by Tami Steinmetz Center for Peace Research, Tel Aviv University, 2001.
- Arabs at the Crossroads: Political Identity and Nationalism. University Press of Florida, 2000.
- Partner or Pariah? Attitudes Toward Israel in Syria, Lebanon, and Jordan. Washington, D.C.: The Washington Institute for Near East Policy, Policy Study no. 41, 1996.
- Khashan, Hilal (1992). Inside the Lebanese Confessional Mind. University Press of America. ISBN 978-0-8191-8778-9.
- Monte Palmer, Mima Nedelcovych, Hilal Khashan, and Deborah Monroe. Survey Research in the Arab World. London: Middle East and North Africa Press, 1982.
