= Administrative divisions of the Gaza Strip =

For the purposes of local government the Gaza Strip is divided into five governorates and twenty-five municipalities.

== History ==
After the 1995 Interim Agreements, the PNA took control of civil affairs in both designated Areas, A and B where ultimately all Palestinian population centers are located (except those within the municipal borders of East Jerusalem). Israel Defense Forces became responsible for security in Area B. The Palestinian Central Bureau of Statistics took its first official census in 1997, and has not taken one since, however they have used provisional estimates to determine the current population. The most current estimate was in 2006. Hamas took control of the Gaza Strip, following the Battle of Gaza (2007) and functioned as the de facto administration in the area until the 2023 Gaza War. United Nations Security Council Resolution 2803, adopted on 17 November 2025, contains provisions for the interim governance of the Gaza Strip.

== Governorates ==
The Gaza Strip is divided into five governorates:

Governorate	Population (2017)	Area (km^{2})	Population density (km^{2})	Capital	Location
Deir al-Balah Governorate	273200	56	4,880	Deir al-Balah	
Gaza Governorate	652597	70	9,300	Gaza City	
Khan Yunis Governorate	370638	108	3,432	Khan Yunis	
North Gaza Governorate	368978	61	6,050	Jabalia	
Rafah Governorate	233878	65	3,598	Rafah	

== Cities ==
The following is a list of cities in the Gaza Strip, their governorates, their specific jurisdictions and their provisional populations as of 2006 by the PCBS.

Common name	Arabic Name	Governorate	Jurisdiction	Population (2007)	Population (2017)
Bani Suheila	بني سهيلا	Khan Yunis	Area A	31,118	41,439
Beit Hanoun	بيت حانون	North Gaza	Area A	37,351	52,237
Beit Lahiya	بيت لاهيا	North Gaza	Area A	63,213	89,838
Deir al-Balah	دير البلح	Deir al-Balah	Area A	53,148	75,132
Gaza City	غزة	Gaza	Area A	438,690	590,481
Jabalia	جباليا	North Gaza	Area A	120,859	172,704
Khan Yunis	خان يونس	Khan Yunis	Area A	140,046	205,125
Rafah	رفح	Rafah	Area A	119,763	171,899

== Municipalities ==
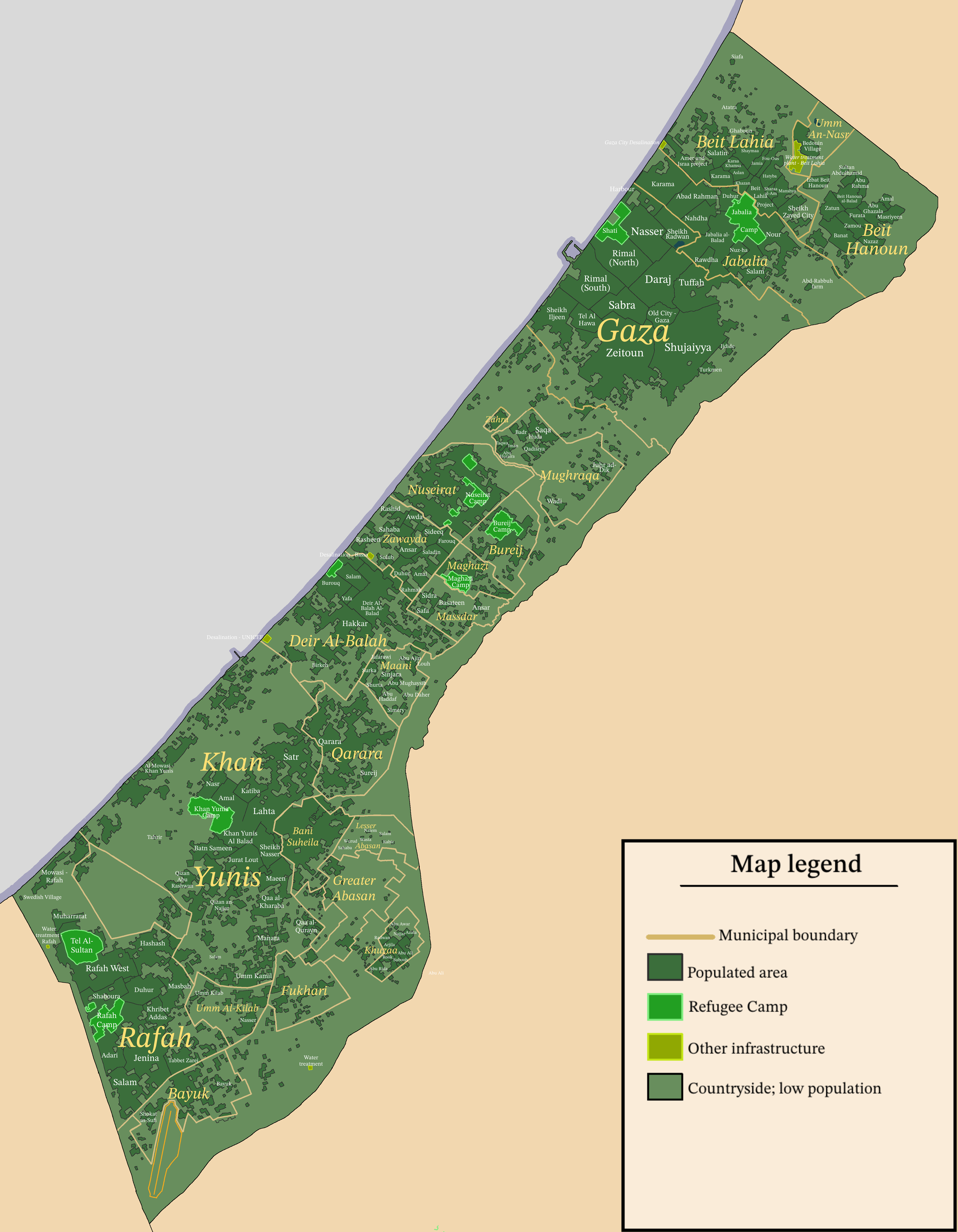
Municipalities in the Gaza Strip

Municipalities in the Gaza Strip include:

- Beit Hanoun
- Beit Lahia
- Umm al-Nasr
- Jabalia
- Gaza City
- Juhor ad-Dik
- Al-Mughraga
- Az-Zahra
- Nuseirat
- Al-Bureij
- Al-Maghazi
- Az-Zawaida
- Al-Musaddar
- Deir al-Balah
- Wadi as-Salqa
- Al-Qarara
- Khan Younis
- Bani Suhaila
- Abasan as-Saghirah
- Abasan al-Kabira
- Khuza'a
- Al-Fukhari
- An-Nasr
- Shokat as-Sufi
- Rafah

== See also ==
- List of cities in Palestine
- Municipality (Palestinian Authority)
- Village Council (Palestinian Authority)
