= Israeli airstrikes on municipal services in the Gaza Strip =

- Part of the Gaza-Israel conflict, Israel-Palestine conflict, Societal breakdown in the Gaza Strip during the Gaza war and genocide
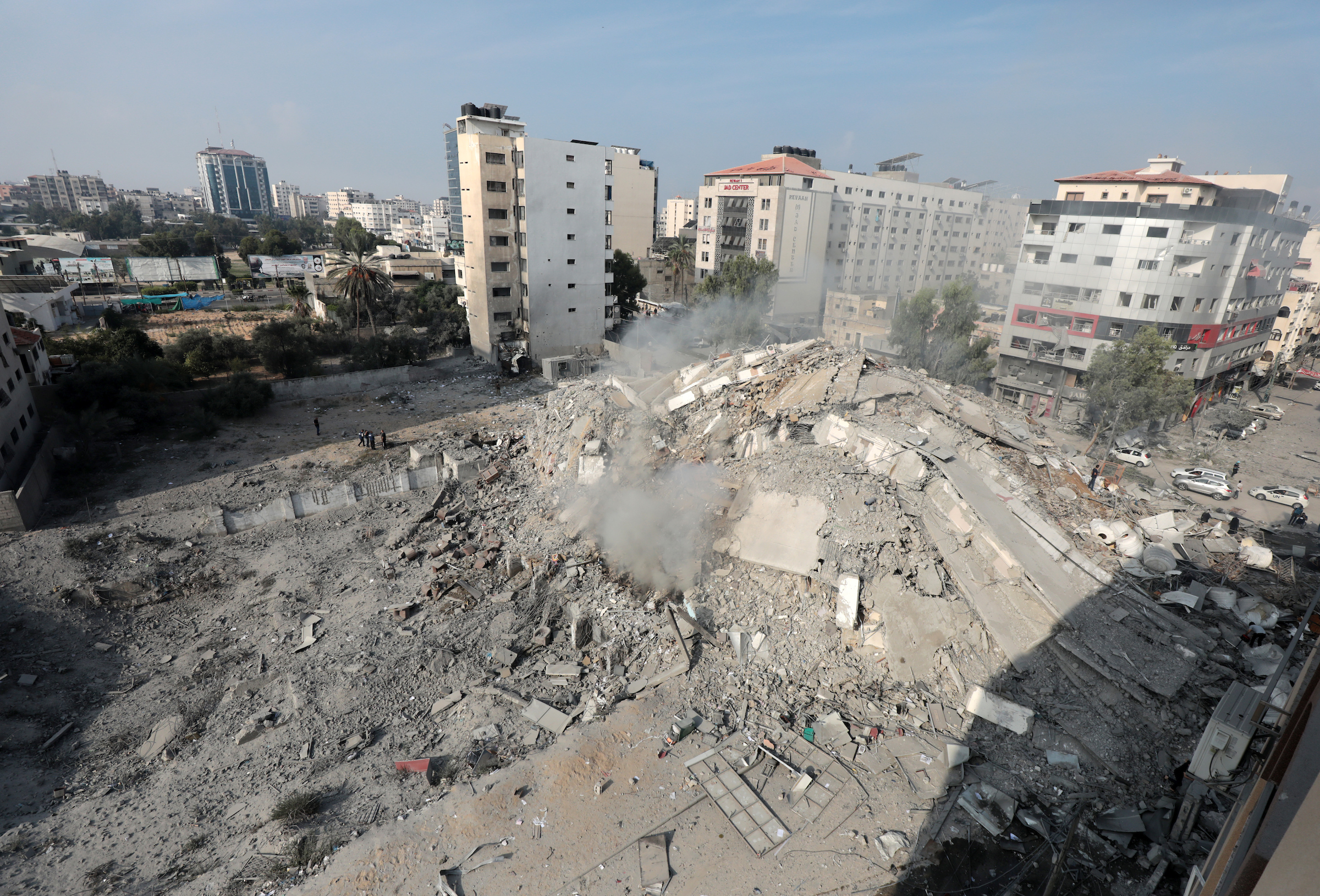
- Extensive destruction to infrastructure and services in the Gaza Strip as a result of Israeli airstrikes during the Gaza war.
Date	7 October 2023 – present
Location	Gaza Strip, Palestine

Belligerents
Israel	Hamas: Gaza Strip municipal services

Commanders and leaders
	Faiq al-Mabhouh †

Units involved
Israel Defense Forces: Israeli air force	Interior Minister of the Gaza Strip: Palestinian Civil Police Force (Hamas) (Note: The Hamas controlled Gaza police force attempted to maintain public order during distribution of humanitarian aid and was targeted by Israeli forces.); Arrow unit; Police patrols; Rad'a Force

Strength
F-15 Eagle; F-16 Fighting Falcon; F-35 Lightning II	No airforce

Casualties and losses
?	4+

The Israel Defense Forces (IDF) have been accused of targeting municipal services in the Gaza Strip, Palestine, as part of the ongoing Gaza war. The service sector in the region has been repeatedly bombed by the IDF, with a large number of workers in this field killed as a result and the destruction of several municipal facilities and vehicles that provide services to Palestinian citizens.

Those attacks also included the destruction of roads and most of the essential service infrastructure such as water tanks, sewage stations, and wells, which the IDF say are built on top of tunnels belonging to Hamas. The Israeli newspaper Haaretz reported in October 2023 that typically, 90% of Gaza's tap water is considered undrinkable, and this situation is exacerbated during times of conflict.

Spokespeople for the IDF and the Israeli government say that the bombings are targeting Hamas leaders, allegedly responsible for the October 7 attacks.

== Key bombings ==
- Bombing the sewage infrastructure in Gaza and other cities in the strip.
- Bombing large water tanks in Beit Lahia and around half of the main usable wells in Jabalia and others.
- Preventing the transfer of solid waste to the main landfills in the eastern areas of the strip, like Juhor ad-Dik, resulting in the accumulation of thousands of tons within cities.
- Bombing industrial facilities leading to the contamination of groundwater and seawater in the strip.
- Bombing the Gaza municipal garage and its maintenance workshop, with a threat to the historic municipal building dating back to 1893.
- A power generator plant with four major generators in Bureij was bombed.
- The Gaza Municipality's emergency committee stated that Israel had destroyed at least one million square meters of Gaza City roads and stated that municipal "services like water, sanitation, and waste management" had been affected.
- In June 2024, the UN estimated Israeli bombardment had destroyed or damaged 70% of Gaza's water and sanitation plants.
- In August 2024, Israeli forces targeted water treatment facilities in the Gaza Strip.
- In October 2024, Israel bombed four water engineers operating in a clearly-marked vehicle with prior authorization and coordination from Israeli authorities.

== Impacts ==
By June 2024, the destruction of municipal services had led to overflowing sewage, large trash garbage piles, and the spread of diseases such as hepatitis and cholera. UNICEF warned that the destruction of municipal services had cut off "reliable access to safe water, toilets and washing facilities" which was causing disease and chronic diarrhoea among children. In July 2024, nine months of Israeli air campaigns severely damaged Gaza's power facilities, leaving portions of the population without any electricity.

== Reactions ==
In May 2024, Yahya Al-Sarraj, the mayor of Gaza City, stated, "The Israeli occupation systematically targeted municipal services and facilities in the Gaza Strip... We have great challenges, the most important of which is providing water and sanitation services." In October 2024, a group of U.S. doctors signed a letter to the Biden Administration, stating that due to the destruction of Gaza's water infrastructure, there was "literally no potable water in Gaza".

== See also ==
- Palestinian genocide allegations
