= Tallet 86 =

Village in Gaza

Tallet 86 is a village in the Gaza Strip of the Palestinian territories, around 8 kilometres (5.0 mi) to the north-east of the town of Khan Yunis and to the east of the main line connecting towns in the sector to Rafah. It is situated halfway between the towns of Deir al-Balah and Khan Yunis. It has an area under 1,000 acres (400 ha), and is 9 km (5.6 mi) from the sea, with views to the sea and the Green Line.

== Toponymy ==
The name "Tallet" in Arabic signifies a hill. Residents suggest that the village took its name from the number of Israeli army unit that was stationed there. (In 1948, a decisive battle was fought at Tallet which stopped the Zionist advance in the sector, who were stopped in their tracks.) An alternative explanation is that it derives from the village being, supposedly, 86 meters above sea level.

== Population ==
According to the Palestinian Central Bureau of Statistics, in 2007 the village had a population of around 2000, dispersed among residential communities near sources of water and the main road.

== Economy ==
The region's main way of life is agricultural. The village is known for growing citrus fruits, almonds, olives and vegetables. The region is also noted for sheep farming.

Residents joined forces to build a primary school without a playground or surrounding walls. The village has no secondary school, therefore, students can only complete their studies at schools in Deir al-Balah. Medical provision is poor; there is one clinic. The main reason is lack of resources. Residents rely on hospitals in Gaza and Khan Yunis. Social, charitable and cultural institutions do not exist as well.

== Infrastructure ==
There is no transportation in the region. The village has no paved roads. Most houses have electricity, but water can only be drawn from private wells. Water is carried by animals, the residents' only mode of transport.

== Sources ==
- "معلومات عن فلسطين". historyofpalestine.weebly.com (in Arabic).
