= Ahmad Kurd =

Palestinian politician (1949–2020)

- أحمد كرد

Mayor of Deir al-Balah
- In office 2005 – 9 May 2020

Personal details
- Born: 13 September 1949 Deir al-Balah, Gaza Strip
- Died: 9 May 2020 Deir al-Balah, Gaza Strip
- Party: Hamas
- Occupation: Politician, Local Sheikh

Ahmad Kurd (Arabic: أحمد كرد; 13 September 1949 – 9 May 2020) was a Palestinian politician, who served as the mayor of Deir al-Balah located in the central Gaza Strip. He was elected as mayor in 2005 as the candidate for the political party, Hamas. He also served as local sheikh in the Deir al-Balah mosque.

Kurd was the director of the Gaza Strip-based charity organization Salah Society. The organization runs a school for orphans in Deir al-Balah.

Kurd was born in Deir al-Balah camp a year after his family of five fled their home village near Ashkelon. The family now numbers 70 people. Ahmad Kurd, who had 11 children with his Russian wife, told The Washington Post, "I'm not asking to return to Ashkelon. I want to live in Deir al Balah, in a decent city, in an independent Palestinian state like other states."
