= Deir al-Balah Camp =

Refugee camp in Deir al-Balah, Gaza Strip, Palestine

- Refugee camp

Arabic transcription(s)
  - Arabic: مخيّم دير البلح
- Location of Deir al-Balah Camp within Palestine
- Coordinates: 31°25′33″N 34°20′26″E
- State: State of Palestine
- Governorate: Deir al-Balah

Government
  - Type: Refugee Camp

Area
  - Total: 0.16 km^{2} (0.062 sq mi)

Population (2017)
  - Total: 6,985
  - Density: 44,000/km^{2} (110,000/sq mi)

Deir al-Balah Camp (Arabic: مخيّم دير البلح) is a Palestinian refugee camp in the Deir al-Balah Governorate of the southern Gaza Strip, located one kilometer northwest of the center of Deir al-Balah city, of which it practically forms part. The camp consists of concrete buildings and has eight schools, sewers, and other municipal services. According to the Palestinian Central Bureau of Statistics, the camp had a population of 6,985 in 2017. It is the smallest refugee camp in the Gaza Strip. Deir al-Balah Camp is built on an area of 0.16 square kilometers (16 hectares; 39 acres (160,000 m^{2})). As of July 2023, the population registered with the United Nations Relief and Works Agency (UNRWA) was 26,674 persons.

== History ==
Originally, the camp housed 9,000 refugees in tents and then mud-brick structures, which were replaced with cement block structures in the early 1960s. The current population is about twice that of the original refugee population, most of whom are now dead.

The original residents of the camp, as with most other Palestinian refugees in the Gaza Strip, came from villages and towns in central and southern pre-1948 Palestine.

Before the 2005 implementation of Israel's unilateral disengagement plan, the camp (and town of which it is part) was surrounded by Israeli settlements—Kfar Darom to the north and Gush Katif to the south—and the highly militarized Abul Holi junction that separated the north of Gaza from the south was located on Deir al-Balah's land.

In late 1997, the Palestinian National Authority demolished several buildings in Deir al-Balah Camp in order to extend the main coastal road between the town and the Mediterranean Sea. Several families were given small plots of land and some financial compensation in order to build new homes outside the settlement.

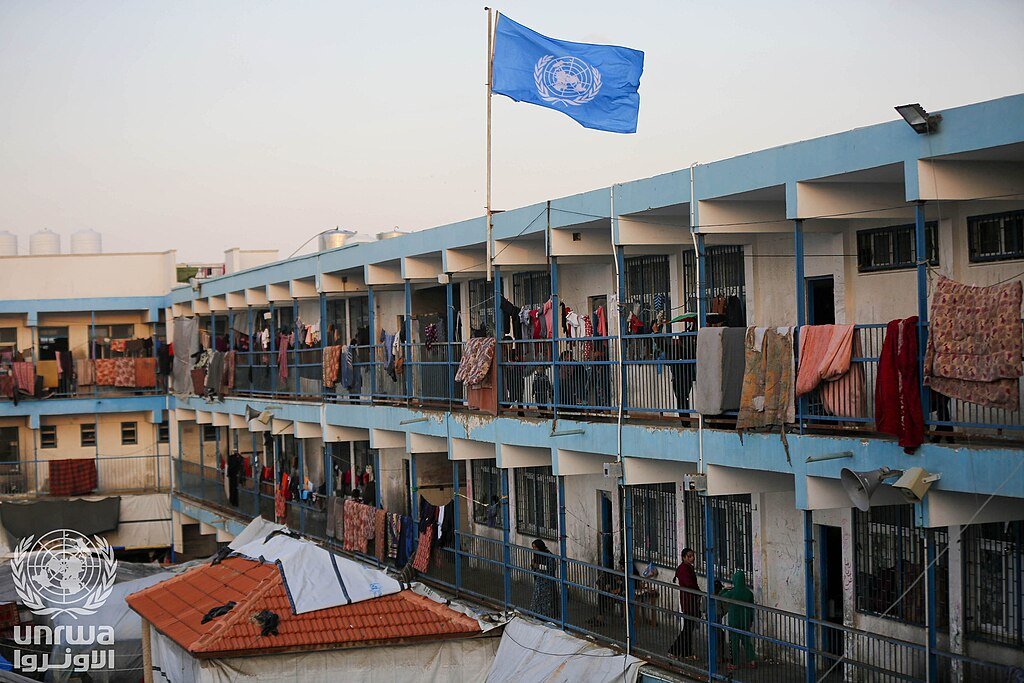
An UNRWA school in Deir al-Balah used to shelter displaced people during the Gaza war

There was no sewage system in the original camp; Palestinian-managed UNRWA constructed one in 1998 with financial assistance from Japan. In the permanent settlement there are eight Palestinian managed UNRWA schools—six elementary and two preparatory—serving about 8,000 students.

Most residents had worked as laborers in Israel before the beginning of the Second Intifada. A minority of residents have also worked as local farm laborers.

=== Events during Second Intifada ===
Throughout the Second Intifada, Deir al-Balah Camp was the site of several Israeli military incursions:

In May 2001 a funeral for four-month-old Iman Hejjo, killed by shrapnel during an Israeli attack on Khan Younis settlement, was held in Deir al-Balah Camp and attended by hundreds of mourners. Her father Mohammed, a policeman, told Reuters that "The killing of my baby will remain as a stigma on the face of Israel and the international community."

According to the Palestinian Human Rights Monitoring Group, on 13 February 2002, Palestinian policeman and camp resident, Shadi Mustafah El-Hassanat, was killed along with two other policeman after five Israeli tanks raided the eastern part of Deir al-Balah and fired flechette shells at them while they sought refuge in a small room near their post.

Residents of Deir al-Balah Camp have also been involved in attempted attacks on Israeli settlements. On 22 November 2003, 24-year-old resident of the camp, Muhammad Suleiman Khalil Sarsur, was killed by Israeli security forces while attempting to infiltrate the Netzarim settlement. On 6 October 2004 17-year-old 'Ali Khaled 'Ali al-Jaru and 21-year-old Iyad Fa'iz Yusef Abu al-'Ata, both from Deir al-Balah Camp, were killed by Israeli security forces while attempting to attack the Kfar Darom settlement.

== Notable people ==
- Abdel Bari Atwan was born in Deir al Balah Camp
