= Gaza War Cemetery =

Military cemetery in Gaza City, Palestine

- مقبرة الإنجليز في غزة
- Commonwealth War Graves Commission
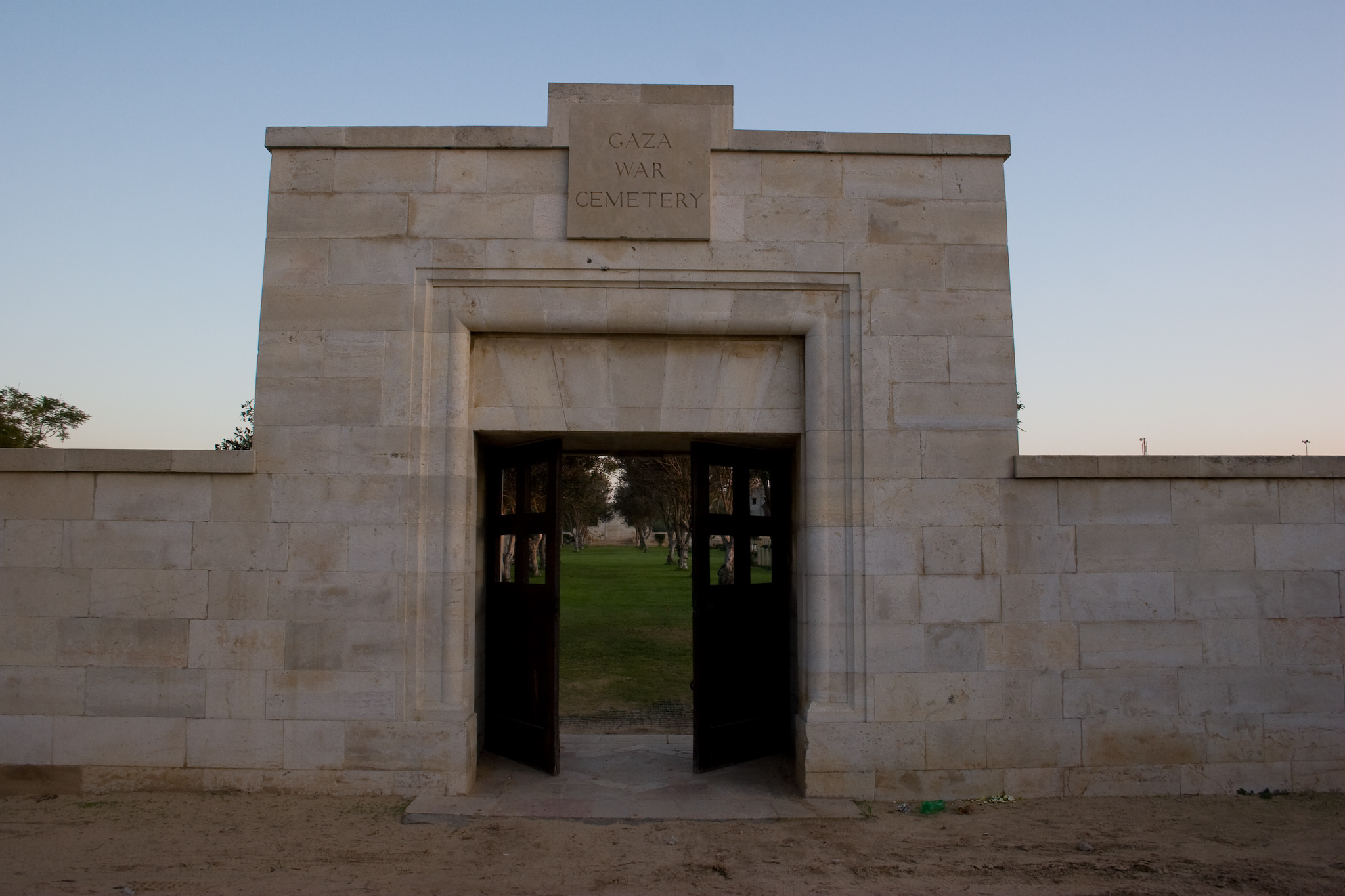
- Entrance to the cemetery
- For Allied and Commonwealth soldiers who died in World War I and World War II
- Established: 1920
- Location: 31.5118°N 34.4822°E; Tuffah, Gaza City, Palestine near Gaza City
- Total burials: 3,691
- Unknowns: Nearly 800
- Commemorated: 3,217 British and Commonwealth soldiers, plus 234 non-Commonwealth soldiers

Burials by nation
- 3,082 British, 263 Australians, 50 Indians, 23 New Zealanders, 23 Canadians, 36 Poles, 184 Ottoman Turks, 53 others

Burials by war
- World War I, World War II, United Nations Emergency Force (1956–1967)

The Gaza War Cemetery (Arabic: مقبرة الإنجليز في غزة) is a cemetery administered by the Commonwealth War Graves Commission on the Salah al-Din Road in Tuffah, Gaza City, Palestine. Before the Gaza war (2023–present), the cemetery's maintenance was managed by the Hamas government in Gaza in coordination with the Commonwealth War Graves Commission.

== Graves ==
The majority of burials at the cemetery are of Allied soldiers who lost their lives in the First World War, principally in the First, Second and Third Battles of Gaza, all in 1917. Some 3,217 British and Commonwealth servicemen are buried in the cemetery; nearly 800 of the graves lack identification, and are inscribed "A Soldier of the Great War, known unto God". 234 graves of non-Commonwealth soldiers are also present in the cemetery. A further 210 Commonwealth soldiers were interred in the cemetery following their deaths in the Second World War. The post-war period saw 30 more burials.

The majority of the graves (3082 of 3691) are British, but there are also the graves of 263 Australians, 50 Indians, 23 New Zealanders, 23 Canadians, 36 Poles, and 184 Ottoman-era Turkish graves, plus small numbers (53) of South African, Greek, Egyptian, German, French and Yugoslavian graves. Among the graves is that of Stanley Boughey (1896–1917), who received the Victoria Cross for action against the Ottoman Army at El Burff, Palestine.

The cemetery also includes memorials for United Nations Emergency Force (UNEF) personnel who died during deployment to the Gaza Strip and Sinai Peninsula from 1956 to 1967. Twenty-two Canadian and eight Indian personnel are commemorated. The Canadian headstones are located in a separate section of the cemetery; while the Indians are commemorated in the Indian section of the main cemetery, alongside Indian personnel of the First World War.

== History ==
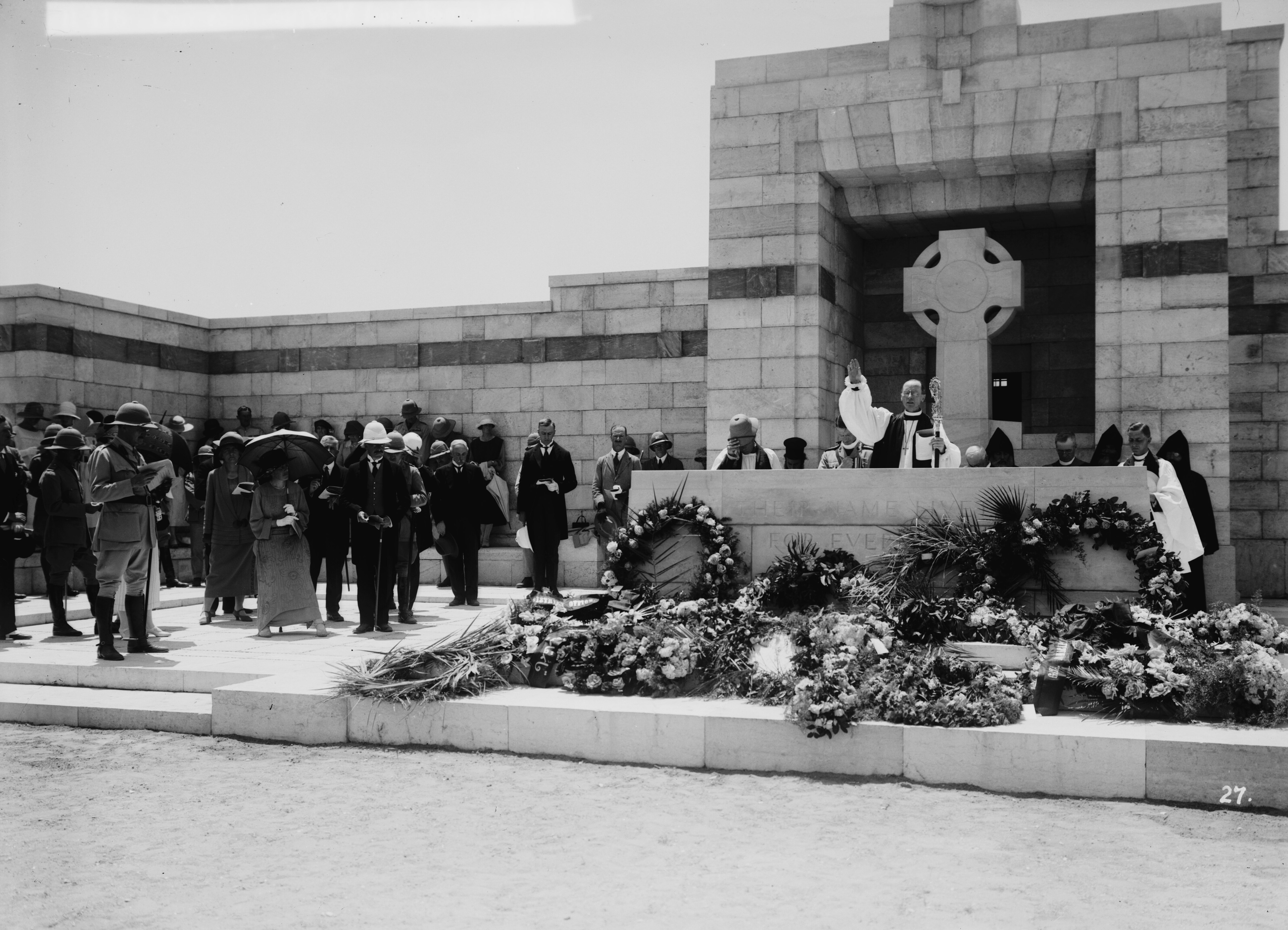
The cemetery's consecration ceremony, 1925

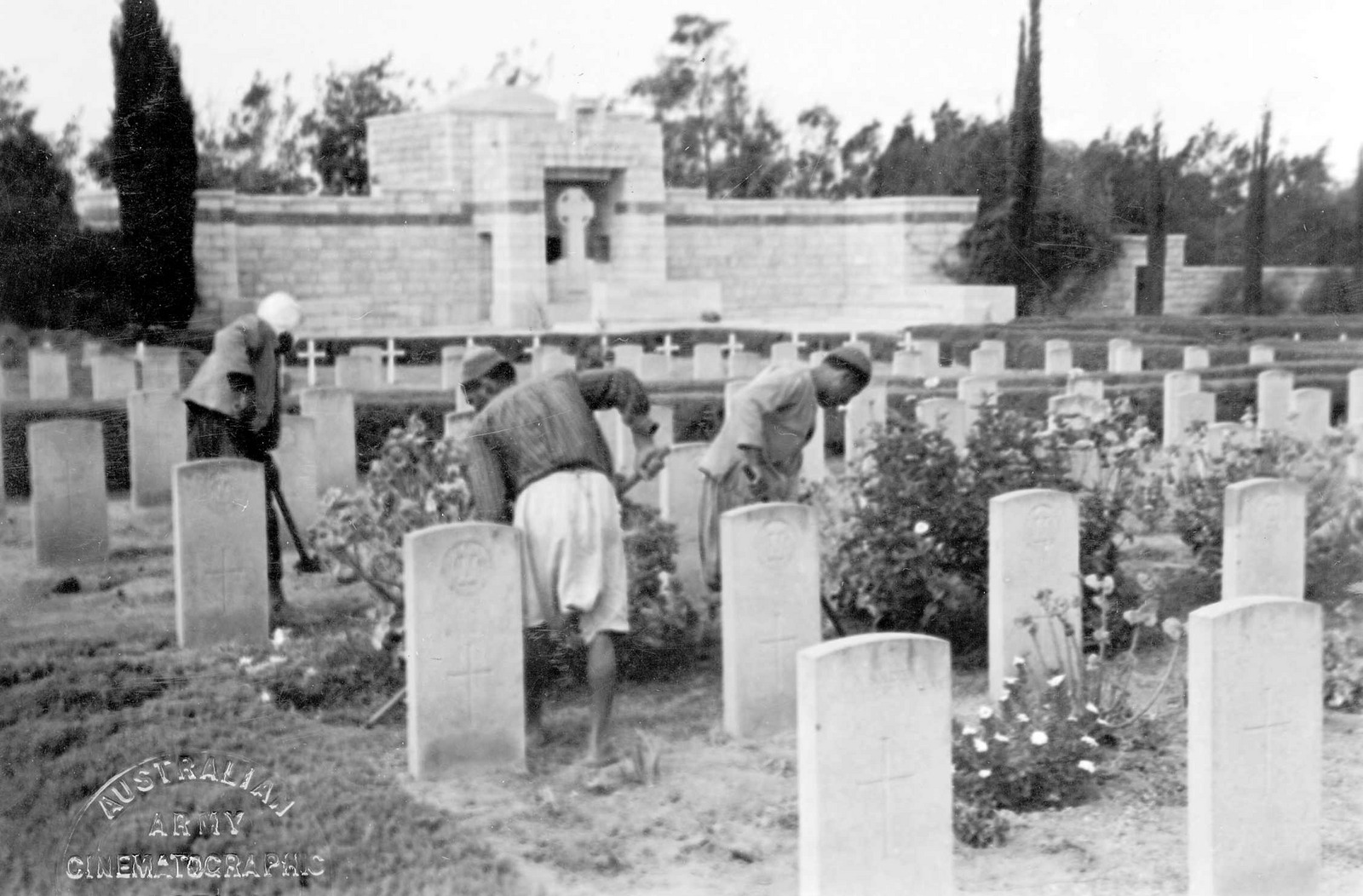
Gardeners working at the cemetery, 1940s

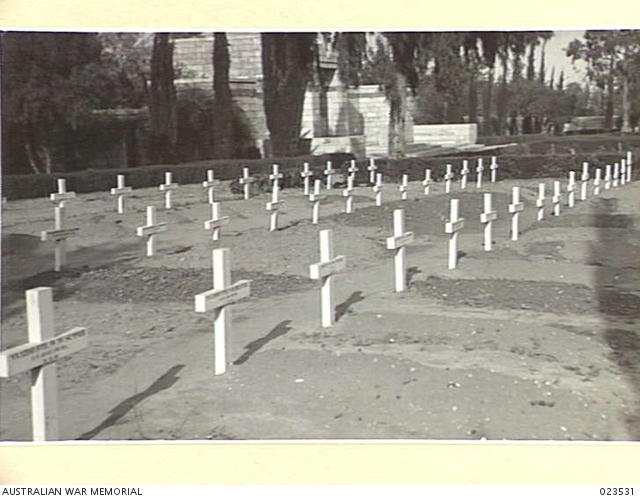
Australian graves in the cemetery, 1942

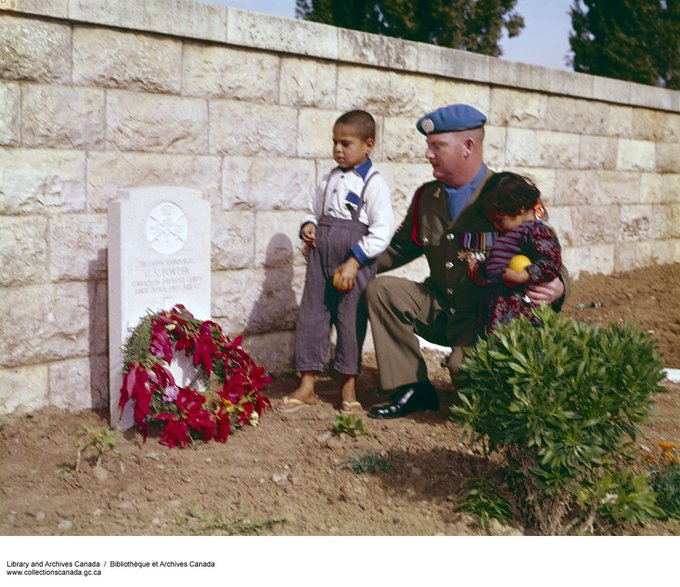
A UN peacekeeper with two Palestinian children next to the grave of a Canadian servicemember

The cemetery was completed by 1920, and has been tended by three men from the same family ever since. For 45 years, the cemetery was tended by Ibrahim Jeradeh, who was employed by the Commonwealth War Graves Commission. Jeradeh's father was the cemetery's initial head gardener, and he himself was succeeded by his son. Jeradeh was awarded an MBE in "grateful recognition of outstanding contribution to the Commonwealth War Graves Commission". The MBE's accompanying certificate was signed by the Duke of Kent.

In 2004, 33 headstones were vandalised in the cemetery, allegedly in retaliation for the Abu Ghraib prisoner abuse scandal.

The cemetery was struck by Israeli shells on two occasions in the 2000s: damage caused by an Israeli airstrike led to £90,000 in compensation being paid to the Commonwealth War Graves Commission in 2006; and some 350 headstones needed repair following damage from Israeli shells in Operation Cast Lead in 2008–2009.

It was reported to have been damaged again in the early stages of the Gaza war in 2023. Subsequent satellite imagery, examined by the Commonwealth War Graves Commission in October 2024, revealed further significant damage following Israeli military operations, including to the boundary walls on all sides, the staff house and base site, the Canadian Section, multiple memorials (54th East Anglian Division, Hindu, Turkish, and Mohammadan sections), and approximately 10% of the headstones across the entire site. In February 2026, The Guardian reported that Israeli forces had bulldozed part of the cemetery, based on satellite imagery and witness testimony. According to the report, gravestones had been removed in the southern section of the site, with the disturbance of the topsoil and a substantial earth berm across the cemetery suggesting that heavy equipment had been used. Particularly affected were Second World War Australian graves. An IDF spokesperson responded that operations took place in the vicinity when it was an active combat zone and that underground infrastructure had been identified and dismantled. However, no evidence was provided by the IDF to support this explanation.

== Media appearances ==
British journalist and writer Mark Urban, whose great-uncle is buried in the cemetery, visited it in 2009 for BBC 2's Newsnight, and wrote an article for The Observer detailing his experiences there.

In 2018, a short Arabic-language documentary film about the cemetery, The Strange Neighbour, was released on YouTube by Gaza-based Ain Media, followed by an English-language subtitled version in 2024.

== Gallery ==
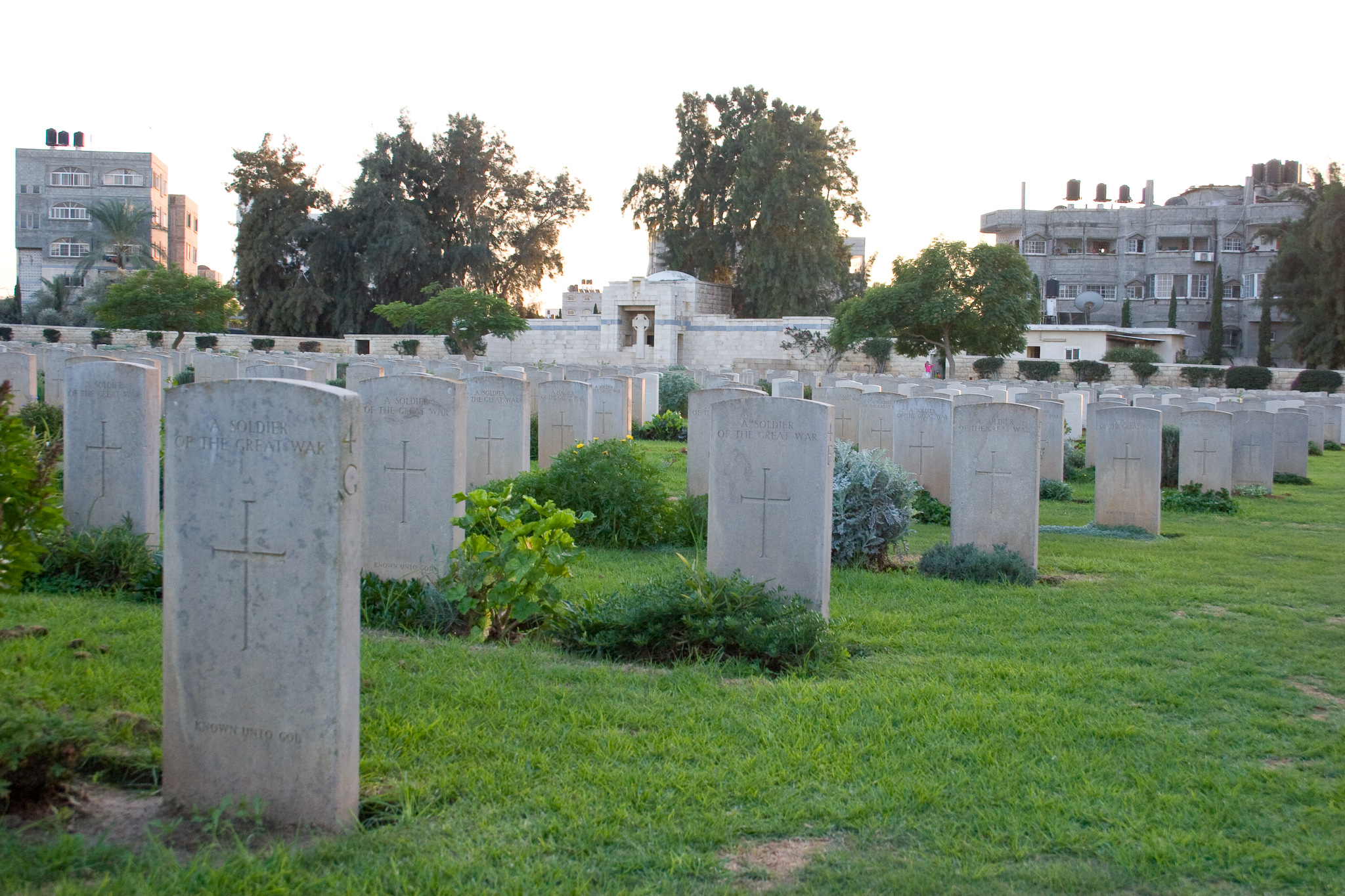
Graves of unidentified soldiers, "Known unto God"

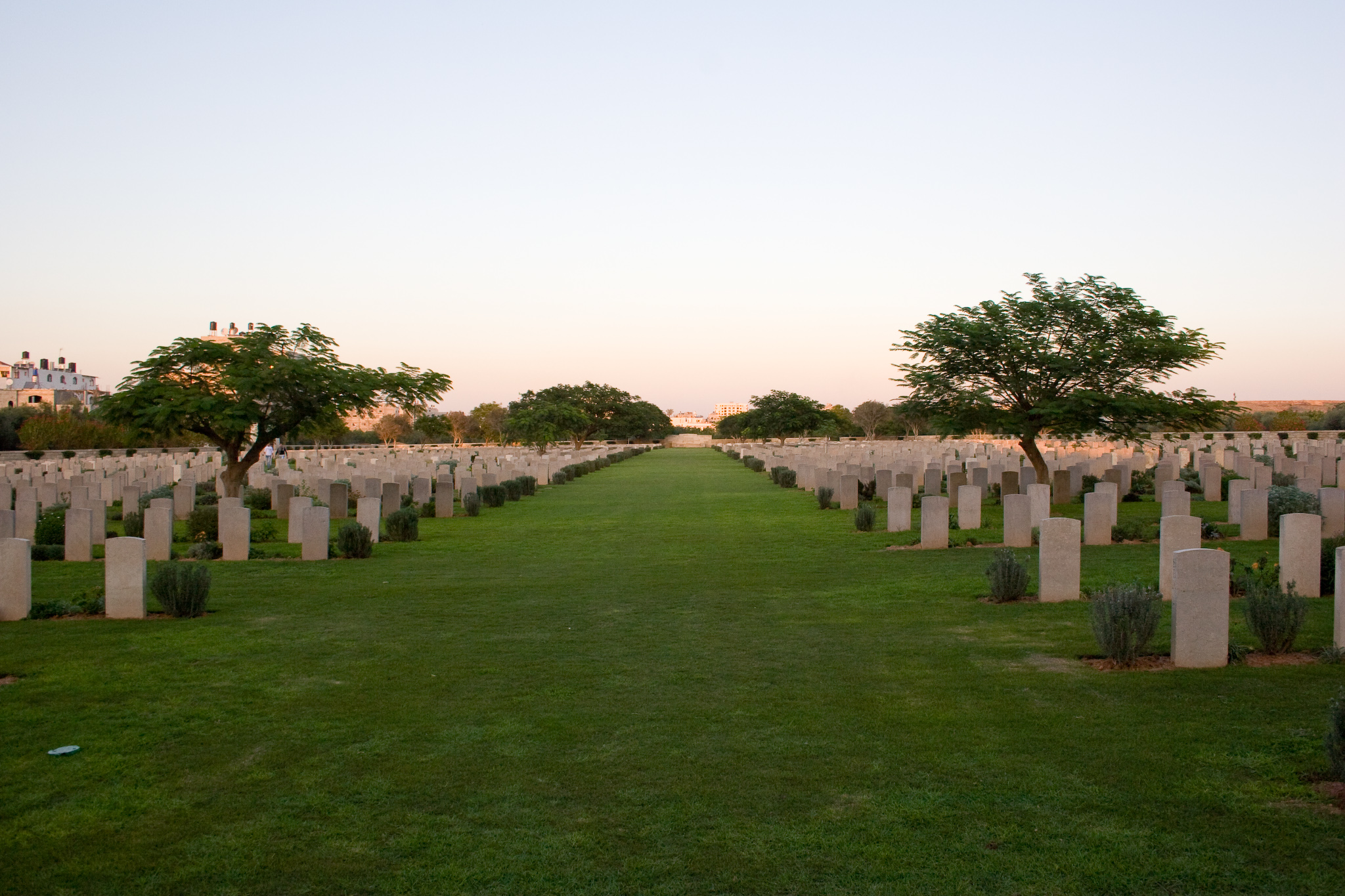
View of the cemetery from its south-west end

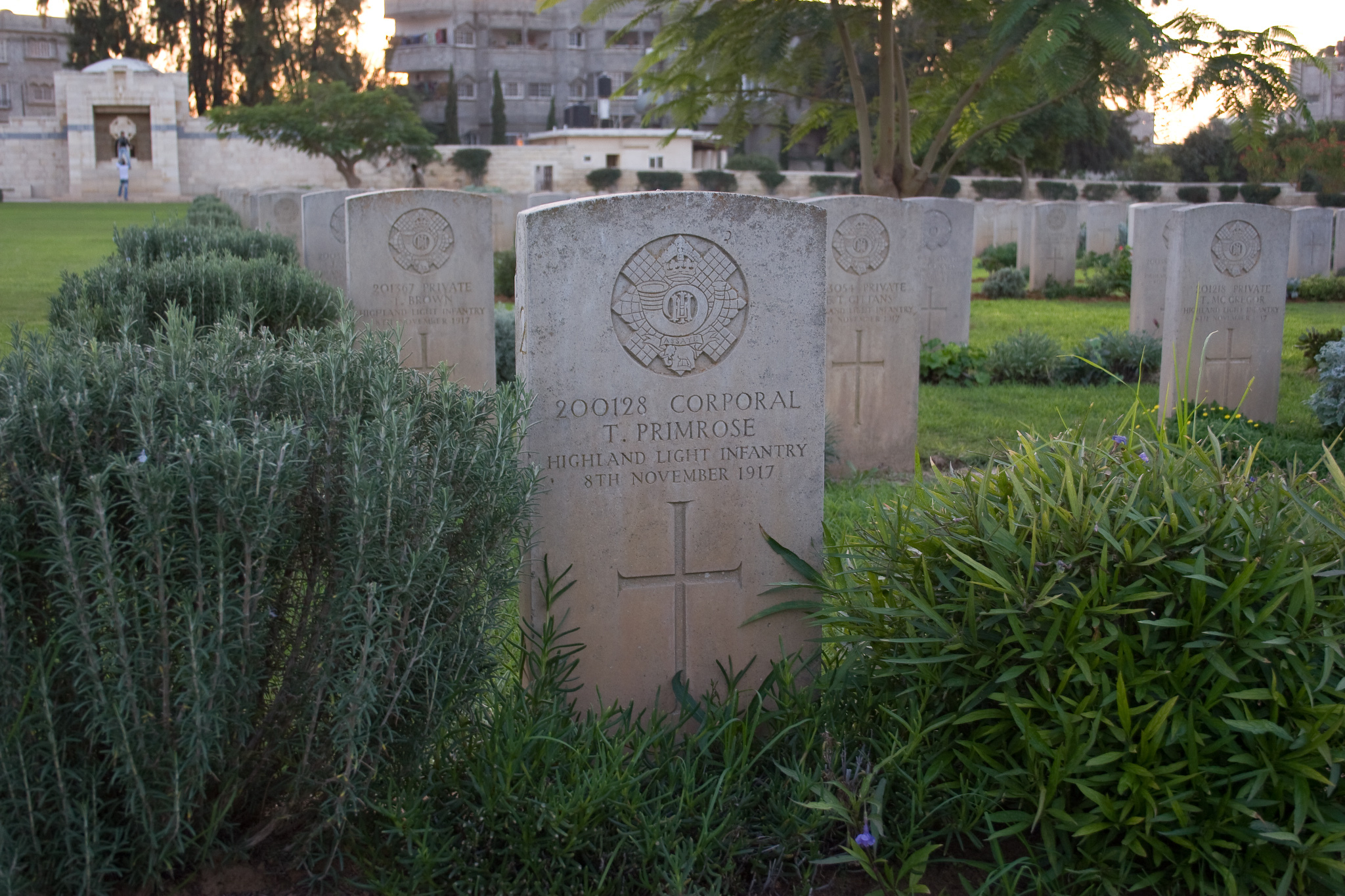
Grave of Corporal T. Primrose, Highland Light Infantry

== See also ==
- Deir El Belah War Cemetery – also maintained by the Commonwealth War Graves Commission
- Destruction of cultural heritage during the Gaza war
- Israeli razing of cemeteries and necroviolence against Palestinians
