= Deir al-Balah offensive =

2025 battle in the Israeli invasion of the Gaza Strip

- Part of the May 2025 Gaza offensive (until 4 August 2025) and the Israeli invasion of the Gaza Strip during the Gaza war
Date	21 July – 10 October 2025
Location	Deir al-Balah, Gaza Strip, Palestine
Result	Ceasefire and Israeli withdrawal

Belligerents
Israel	Hamas; Palestinian Islamic Jihad Unknown armed group impersonating aid workers (in August 2025)

Units involved
(Israel) Israeli Defence Forces; Israeli Ground Forces; Golani Brigade; Israeli Air Force	(Palestine) Palestinian Joint Operations Room; (Hamas) Al-Qassam Brigades; Al-Quds Brigades

Casualties and losses
(Israel) Unknown	(Palestine) Unknown
- 13 killed by airstrikes 19 Palestinian civilians died from hunger

On 20 July 2025, Israel began an air and ground offensive in Deir al-Balah as part of its invasion of the Gaza Strip during the Gaza war.

== Background ==
The Israel Defense Forces (IDF) had not launched an offensive into Deir al-Balah since the start of the Gaza war, though the city had experienced intensifying Israeli aerial bombardment and incidents such as the World Central Kitchen aid convoy attack in April 2024 and Deir al-Balah mosque bombing in October 2024. According to Israeli sources, the IDF had stayed out of Deir al-Balah because it suspected Hamas might be holding hostages there. The offensive began as more than 130 Palestinians were killed and over 1,000 were wounded by Israeli gunfire the previous day.

=== Prelude to offensive ===
On the night of 16–17 May, the IDF began a ground advance towards Deir al-Balah for the first time during the war, as part of its "Operation Gideon's Chariots" offensive throughout the Gaza Strip.

On 20 July, the IDF issued evacuation orders for Deir al-Balah by dropping leaflets, calling on all its displaced residents to evacuate immediately to al-Mawasi. The evacuation orders would force between 50,000 and 80,000 people in Deir al-Balah to leave the city, leaving 87.8% of the Gaza Strip under evacuation orders. On the same day, it began conducting airstrikes in the area.

== Timeline ==
=== 21 July ===
The IDF intensified its airstrikes on Deir al-Balah and began a ground incursion into the southern and eastern parts of the city. Medical Aid for Palestinians reported Israeli shelling and quadcopter strikes around their office in the city. Israeli tanks subsequently advanced into the outskirts of Deir al-Balah. Israel Army Radio stated that the Golani Brigade had "begun a ground maneuver in the southern Deir al-Balah area." Tank shelling in the city hit houses and mosques, killing at least three Palestinians and wounding several others. The United Nations reported that its guesthouses in Deir al-Balah were attacked three times, with airstrikes causing extensive damage and a fire. The IDF raided UN facilities and handcuffed and stripped two WHO staff and two family members and held them at gunpoint, later releasing three while keeping one staff member in detention. Hamas said it ambushed Israeli troops invading Deir al-Balah, detonating a "powerful landmine" in Umm Dhahir as a Merkava tank passed by.

=== 27 July ===
The IDF said it was beginning a "tactical suspension of military operations for humanitarian purposes" in al-Mawasi, Deir al-Balah and Gaza City from 10 AM to 8 PM local time every day until further notice.

=== 28 July ===
Unidentified perpetrators fired on a crowd of Gazans rushing to get airdropped aid packages in Deir al-Balah.

=== 6 August ===
20 Gazans were killed on a road southeast of Deir al-Balah, under Israeli military control, after crowds swarmed and climbed on top of aid trucks, causing four of the vehicles to overturn and cause fatalities.

=== 11 August ===
Disguised IDF special forces in Deir al-Balah arrested a Palestinian, for undisclosed reasons. Following the arrest, airstrikes on the city were reported.

=== 13 August ===
The IDF said it struck and killed "five armed terrorists" in Deir al-Balah who were impersonating aid workers from World Central Kitchen (WCK), wearing their uniforms and using a vehicle marked with the WCK logo. The IDF said it was not clear to what group or organization the men belonged, and WCK condemned the impersonation of its staff.

=== 21 August ===
The IDF struck a Hamas rocket launch site in Deir al-Balah.

=== 10 October ===
By the time of the implementation of the Gaza Strip ceasefire on 10 October, Deir al-Balah had not been overrun nor leveled by Israeli forces. The city was included in the overall zone from which the IDF withdrew.

== Reactions ==
=== State actors ===
- United Kingdom: Foreign Minister David Lammy condemned the offensive and said it puts the Israeli hostages in "grave danger." He also said that Israel must answer "what possible military justification can there be for strikes that have killed desperate starving children."

=== Intergovernmental organizations ===
- United Nations: UN spokesperson Stéphane Dujarric condemned the offensive, stating that it threatens to deprive hundreds of thousands of Palestinians of a main source of drinking water.
  - World Health Organization: The WHO condemned what it called a "blatant attack" on its facilities and staff in Deir al-Balah, and called for a ceasefire. WHO Director-General Tedros Adhanom Ghebreyesus demanded the "immediate release of the detained staff and protection of all its staff."
  - UN Human Rights Office: OHCHR chief Volker Türk said the offensive would "invariably lead to further civilian deaths" and has " added more misery to the suffering of hungry Palestinians."

== See also ==
- Gaza humanitarian crisis (2023–present)
- Battle of Khan Yunis (2025)
- 2025 Shuja'iyya offensive
- 2025 Beit Hanoun offensive and siege
- 2025 Gaza City offensive
