= Deir El Belah War Cemetery =

Military cemetery in Gaza City, Palestine

- مقبرة الإنجليز في دير البلح
- Commonwealth War Graves Commission
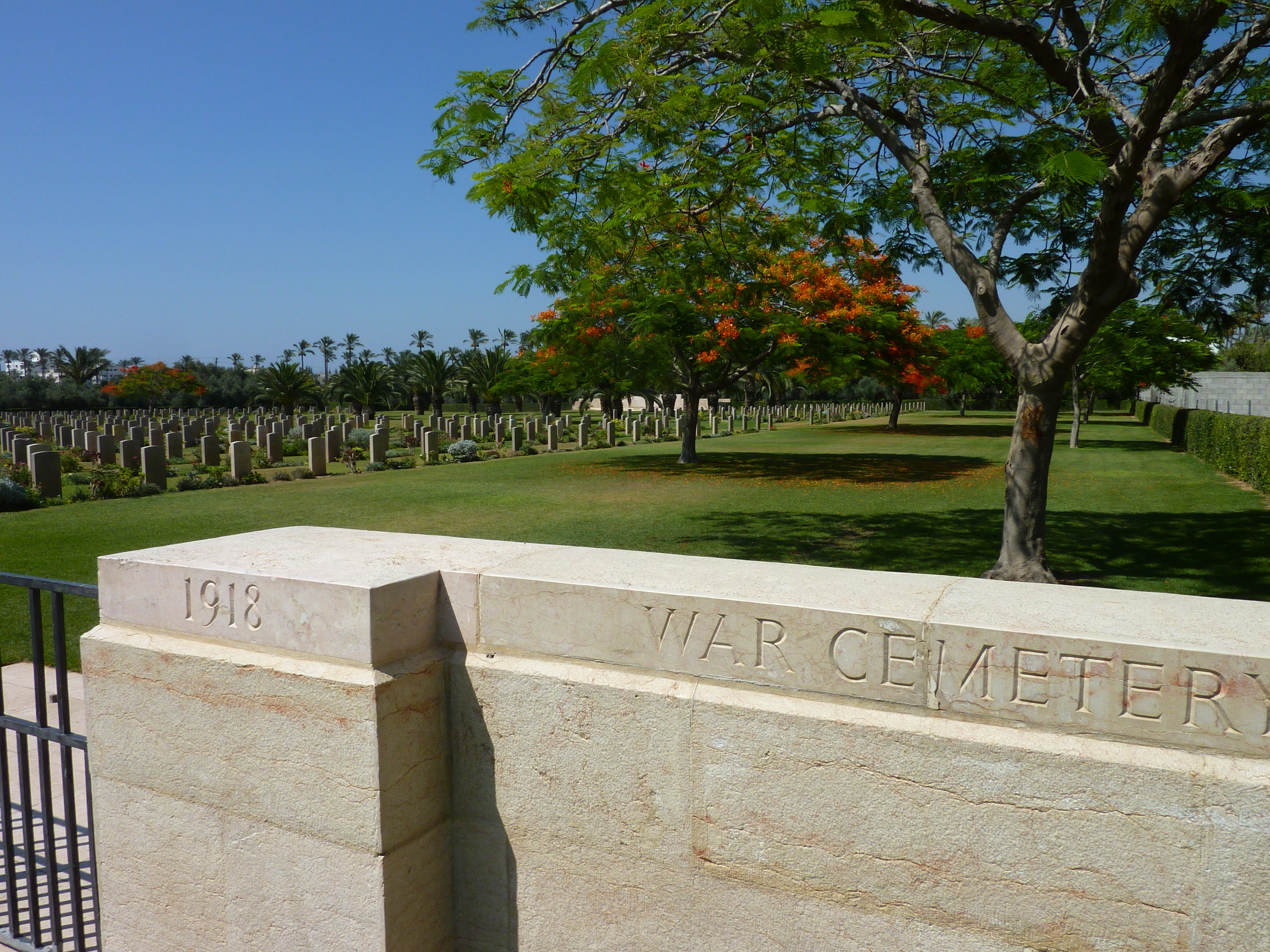
- The cemetery seen from the entrance in 2010
- For Allied and Commonwealth soldiers who died in World War I
- Established: March 1917
- Location: 31.4250°N 34.3736°E; Deir al-Balah, Gaza Strip, Palestine near Az-Zawayda
- Total burials: 724
- Unknowns: 5

The Deir El Balah War Cemetery was established in March 1917. After the Armistice of Mudros ended the Ottoman Empire's participation in the First World War, some graves were relocated from nearby to the Deir El Balah War Cemetery. It was used until 1919. In 1998, names of casualties from the Indian Army that were interred at the cemetery were added to the cemetery's register; previously there was a memorial that did not name the casualties.

According to the Commonwealth War Graves Commission, which is responsible for maintaining the cemetery, about 10% of the headstones had been damaged as a result of the Gaza war by June 2025. The Hindu, Sikh, and Muslim memorials had also sustained damage. A report by the Centre for Cultural Heritage Preservation noted that the bombing and fire were the main causes of the damage.

The cemetery contains 724 graves of Commonwealth soldiers, including an Indian section with 64 burials, and 35 Australians.

== See also ==
- Gaza War Cemetery – also maintained by the Commonwealth War Graves Commission
