= Deir al-Balah Governorate =

Governorate of Palestine

Coordinates: 31.42°N 34.35°E

Deir al-Balah Governorate محافظة دير البلح
- Governorate
- Interactive map of Deir al-Balah Governorate
- Country: Palestine
- Territory: Gaza Strip

Area
  - Total: 56 km^{2} (22 sq mi)

Population (2022)
  - Total: 310,820
  - Density: 5,600/km^{2} (14,000/sq mi)

The Deir al-Balah Governorate (Arabic: محافظة دير البلح Muḥāfaẓat Dayr al Balaḥ), also referred to as Central Gaza Governorate (Arabic: محافظة الوسطى) is one of 16 Governorates of Palestine in the central Gaza Strip which is administered by Hamas aside from its border with Israel, airspace, and maritime territory. Its total land area consists of 56 sq. kilometers. According to the Palestinian Central Bureau of Statistics, in mid-year 2022 it had a population of 310,820 inhabitants distributed between eight localities.

== Localities ==
=== Cities ===
- Deir al-Balah (Deir al Balah)

=== Municipalities ===
- az-Zawayda (Zawaida)

=== Village councils ===
- al-Musaddar
- Wadi as-Salqa

=== Refugee camps ===
The Deir al-Balah Governate houses several U.N. refugee camps. The population of the camps was estimated at 190,000 people in 2023.

- Bureij
- Deir al-Balah Camp
- Maghazi
- Nuseirat
