= Kfar Darom =

Defunct Israeli settlement in the Gaza Strip

Kfar Darom: כְּפַר דָּרוֹם (Hebrew)
- Former Israeli settlement
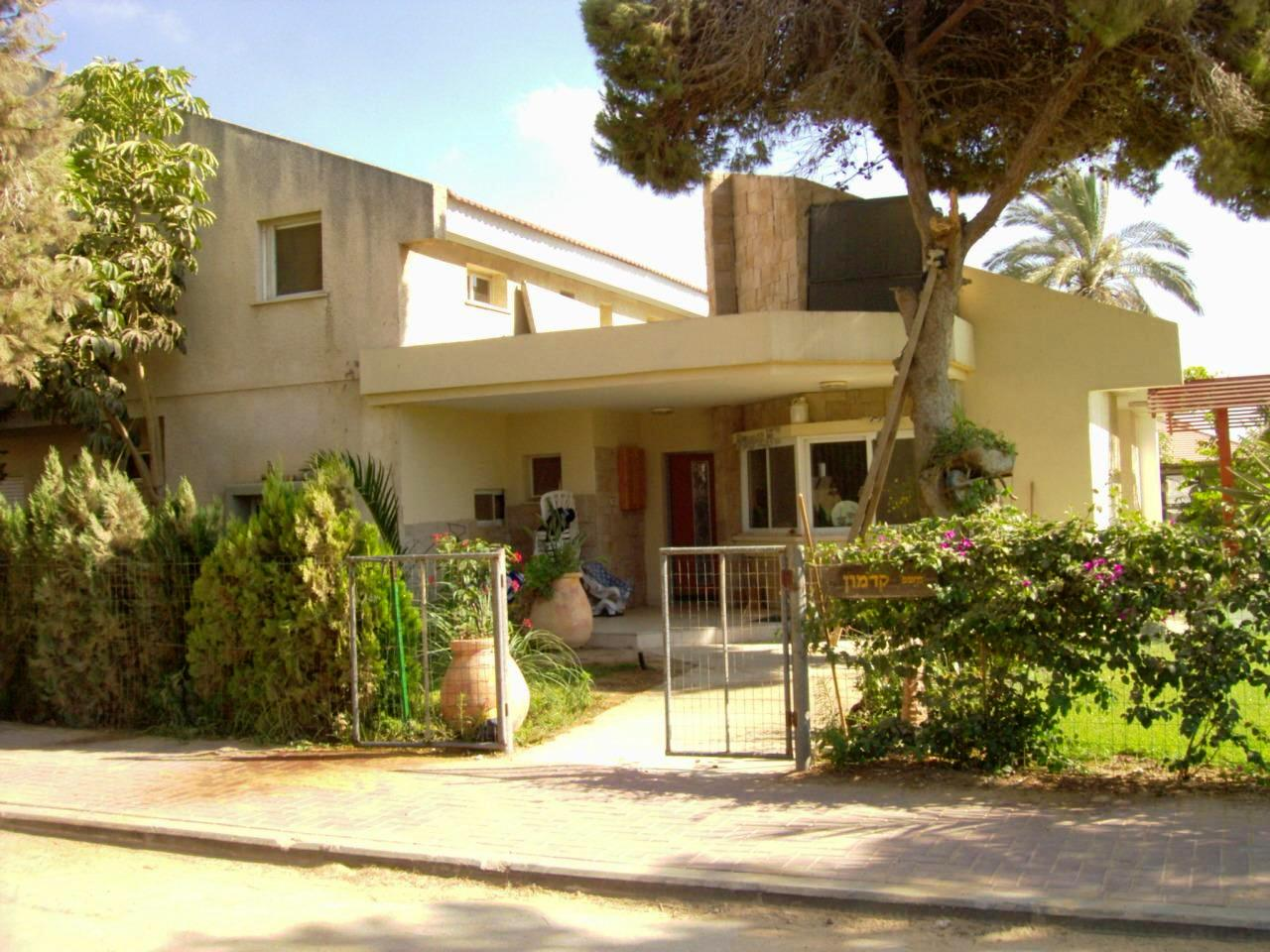

- Location within the Gaza Strip
- Coordinates: 31°24′05″N 34°21′36″E
- Country: Israel
- Region: Gaza Strip
- Affiliation: Religious Kibbutz Movement
- Founded: 1930 (original); 1970 (re-establishment)
- Founder: Hapoel HaMizrachi members

Kfar Darom (Hebrew: כְּפַר דָּרוֹם, lit. 'South Village') was a kibbutz and an Israeli settlement within the Gush Katif bloc in the Gaza Strip.

== History ==
Kfar Darom was founded on 250 dunams of land (about 25 hectares or 60 acres) purchased in 1930 by Tuvia Miller for a fruit orchard on the site of an ancient Jewish settlement of the same name mentioned in the Talmud. Following the 1936–1939 Arab revolt in Palestine, Miller sold his land to the Jewish National Fund in 1946. A community was established on the land at the close of Yom Kippur on 5 and 6 October 1946, by Hapoel HaMizrachi's kibbutz movement as part of the 11 points in the Negev settlement plan.

In the summer of 1948, after numerous battles, the community was abandoned following a three-month siege by the Egyptian Army during the 1948 Arab–Israeli War.

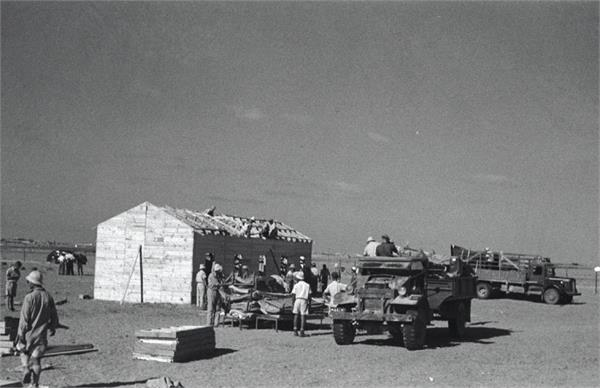
Kfar Darom, first house 1946

Following Israel's victory in the Six-Day War in 1967, and its subsequent occupation of the Gaza Strip, a Nahal military outpost was established at the site in 1970. In 1989, this was converted to a civilian community by the Israeli national unity government of Shimon Peres (Alignment) and Yitzhak Shamir (Likud).

The village also had an elementary school, a kollel for religious (adult married men) students and the "Torah and Land" Institute, for research into religious laws relating to agriculture in Israel. The visitor center contained the Garden of Commandments Museum, which illustrated commandments relating to the Land of Israel.

The site of the former kibbutz is the Palestinian agricultural town Wadi as-Salqa.

== Disengagement ==
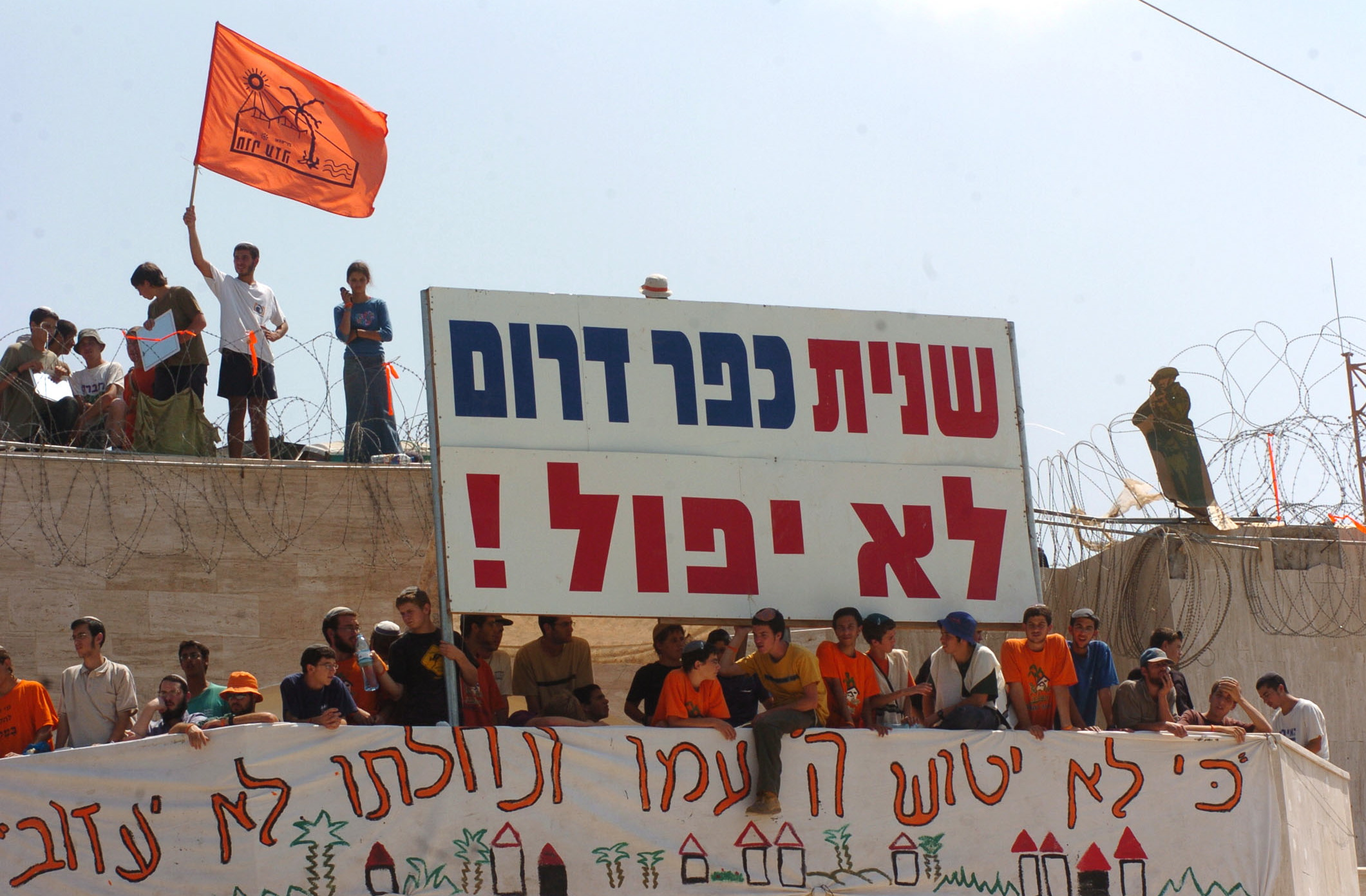
Residents protest against the evacuation of Kfar Darom. The sign reads: "Kfar Darom will not fall twice!" 18 August 2005

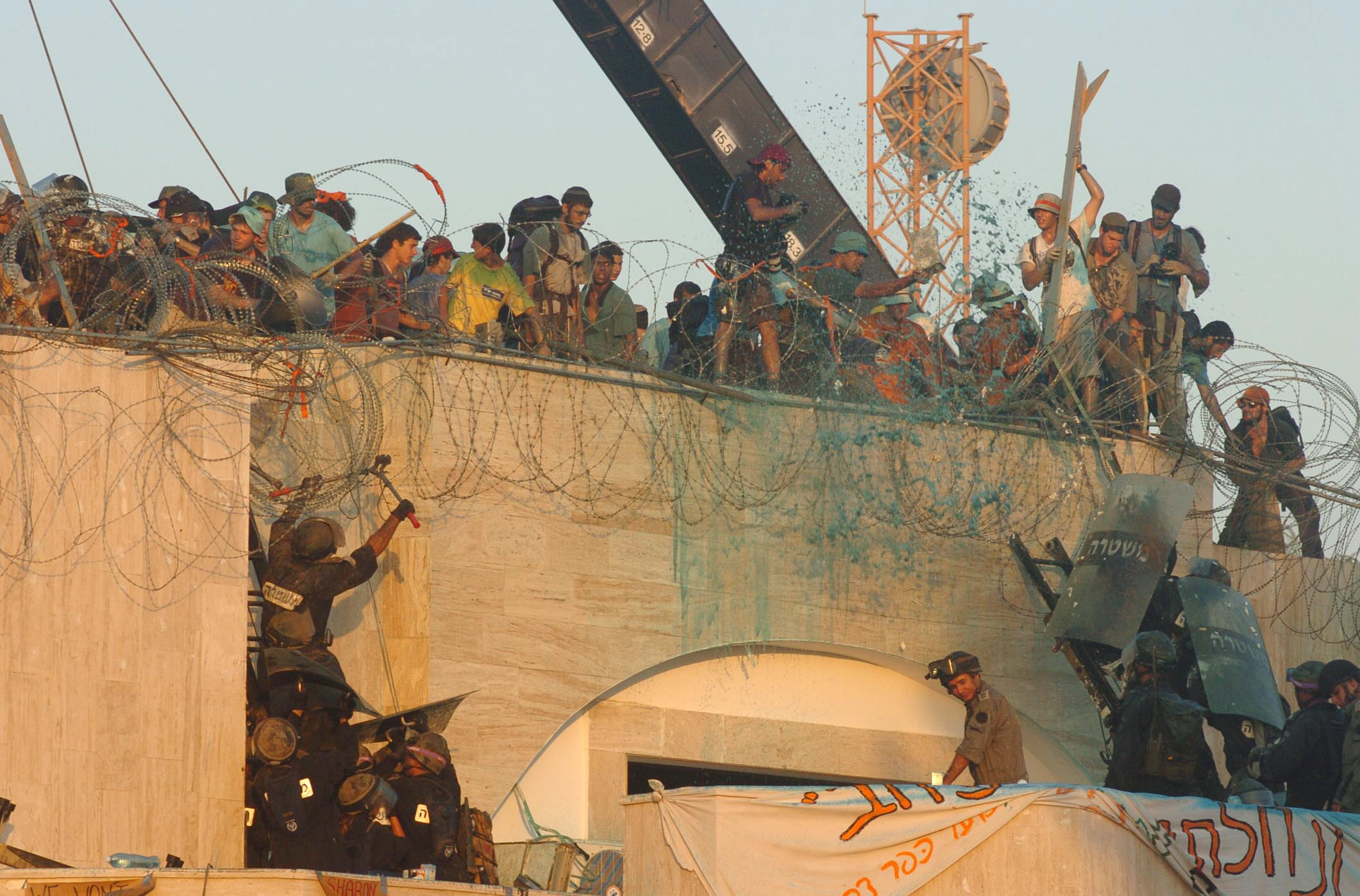
Forced evacuation of Kfar Darom, 18 August 2005

At the point of the disengagement plan in 2005, there were about sixty families, totaling about 330 people, who earned their living from the free working professions, agriculture, and a central packing center for the vegetables produced by the Gaza settler communities.
