= Deir al-Balah =

City in Gaza Strip, Palestine

Deir al-Balah دير البلح
- Municipality type A (City)

Arabic transcription(s)
  - Arabic: دير البلح
  - Latin: Deir el-Balah (unofficial); Dayr al-Balah (official)
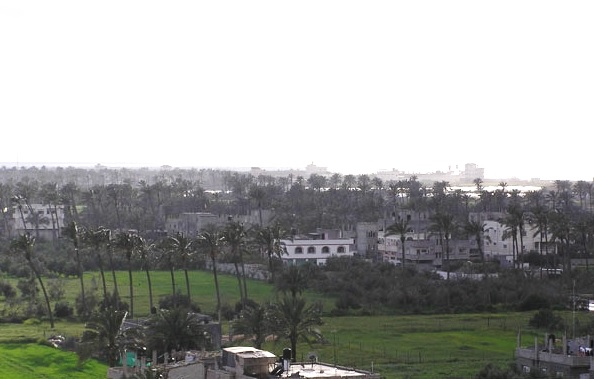
- Skyline of Deir al-Balah, 2008

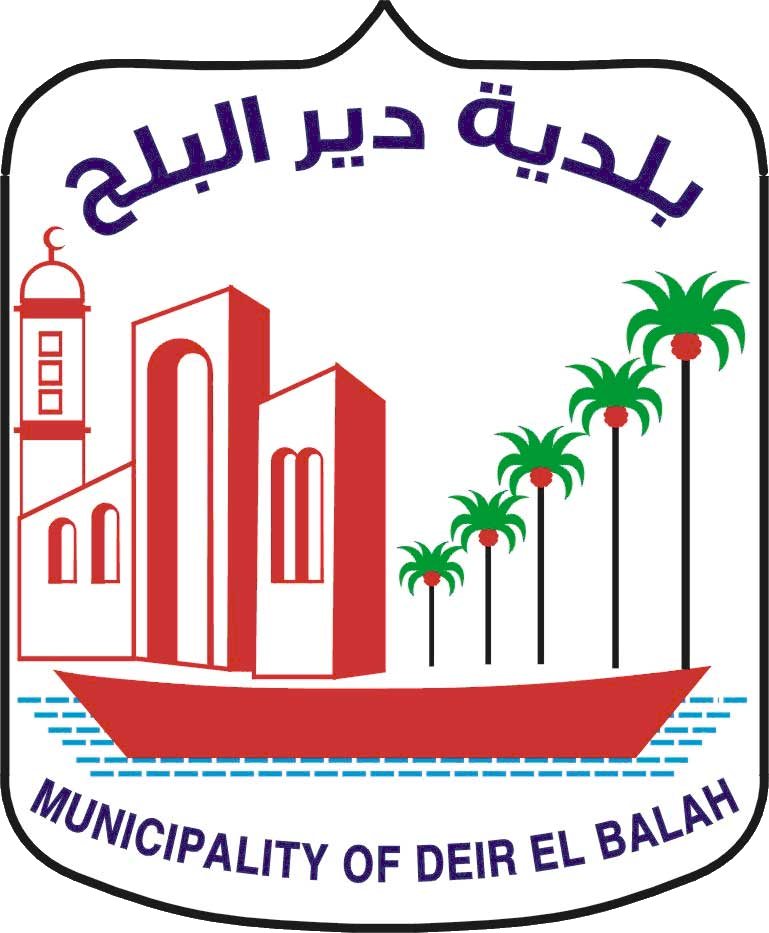
- Interactive map of Deir al-Balah
- Location of Deir al-Balah within Palestine
- Palestine grid: 088/092
- State: State of Palestine
- Governorate: Deir al-Balah
- Founded: 14th century BC

Government
  - Type: City (from 1994)
  - Control: Hamas
  - Head of Municipality: Imad al-Jarou

Area
  - Total: 14.7 km^{2} (5.7 sq mi)

Population (2017)
  - Total: 75,132
  - Estimate (2025): 350,000
  - Density: 5,110/km^{2} (13,200/sq mi)
- Name meaning: "Monastery of the Date Palm"

Deir al-Balah (Arabic: دير البلح, lit. 'Monastery of the Date Palm') is a city in the center of the Gaza Strip, Palestine, and the administrative capital of the Deir al-Balah Governorate. It is located over 14 kilometers (8.7 mi) south of Gaza City. The city had a population of 75,132 in 2017. The city is known for its date palms, after which it is named.

Deir al-Balah dates back to the Late Bronze Age when it served as a fortified outpost for the New Kingdom of Egypt. A monastery was built there by the Christian monk Hilarion in the mid-4th century AD and is currently believed to be the site of a mosque dedicated to Saint George, known locally as al-Khidr. During the Crusader-Ayyubid wars, Deir al-Balah was the site of a strategic coastal fortress known as Deir al-Darum which was continuously contested, dismantled and rebuilt by both sides until its final demolition in 1196. Afterward, the site grew to become a large village on the postal route of the Mamluk Sultanate (13th–15th centuries). It served as an episcopal see of the Greek Orthodox Church of Jerusalem during Ottoman times until the late 19th century.

Egyptian occupation after 1948 saw the population triple from the influx of refugees during the 1948 Arab–Israeli War. It was a prosperous agricultural town. Israel captured the region during the Six-Day War. Deir al-Balah became the first city to come under Palestinian self-rule in 1994. Since the outbreak of the Second Intifada in 2000, it has witnessed frequent incursions by the Israel Defense Forces with the stated aim of stopping Qassam rocket fire into Israel. Ahmad Kurd, a Hamas member, was elected mayor in late January 2005.

By late 2024, a tented camp had been established at Deir al-Balah. "Smile of Hope Camp" is managed by the Palestinian Red Crescent and provides care and facilities for people with disabilities.

== Etymology ==
=== Deir al-Balah etc. ===
"Deir al-Balah", which in Arabic translates as the "Monastery of the Date Palm", was named after the grove of date palms that lay west of the city. Its name dates back to the late 19th century, before which the city was locally known as "Deir Mar Jiryis" or "Deir al-Khidr" and "Deir Darum" in Ottoman records. "Mar Jiryis" translates as "Saint George" while in Islamic tradition al-Khidr could either refer to Saint George or Elijah. The inhabitants of Deir al-Balah associated al-Khidr with Saint George. The town had been named after al-Khidr, the most venerated saintly person throughout Palestine. The mosque in Deir al-Balah which bears his name is traditionally believed by locals to contain his tomb.

=== Darom etc. ===
Up until the later Ottoman era, Deir al-Balah was referred to in Arabic as "Darum" or "Darun" which derived from the settlement's Crusader-era Latin name "Darom" or "Doron." That name was explained by the Crusader chronicler William of Tyre as a corruption of domus Graecorum, "house of the Greeks" (dar ar-rum). More recently, the eighteenth century scholar Albert Schultens supposed its roots are the Ancient Hebrew name "Darom" or "Droma", from the Hebrew root for "south", which referred to the area south of Lydda, i.e. the southern parts of the coastal plain and Judean foothills together with the northern Negev Desert. During early Arab rule, "ad-Darum" or "ad-Dairan" was the name of the southern subdistrict of Bayt Jibrin, a corruption of the Aramaic name of the region, Daroma.

== Geography ==
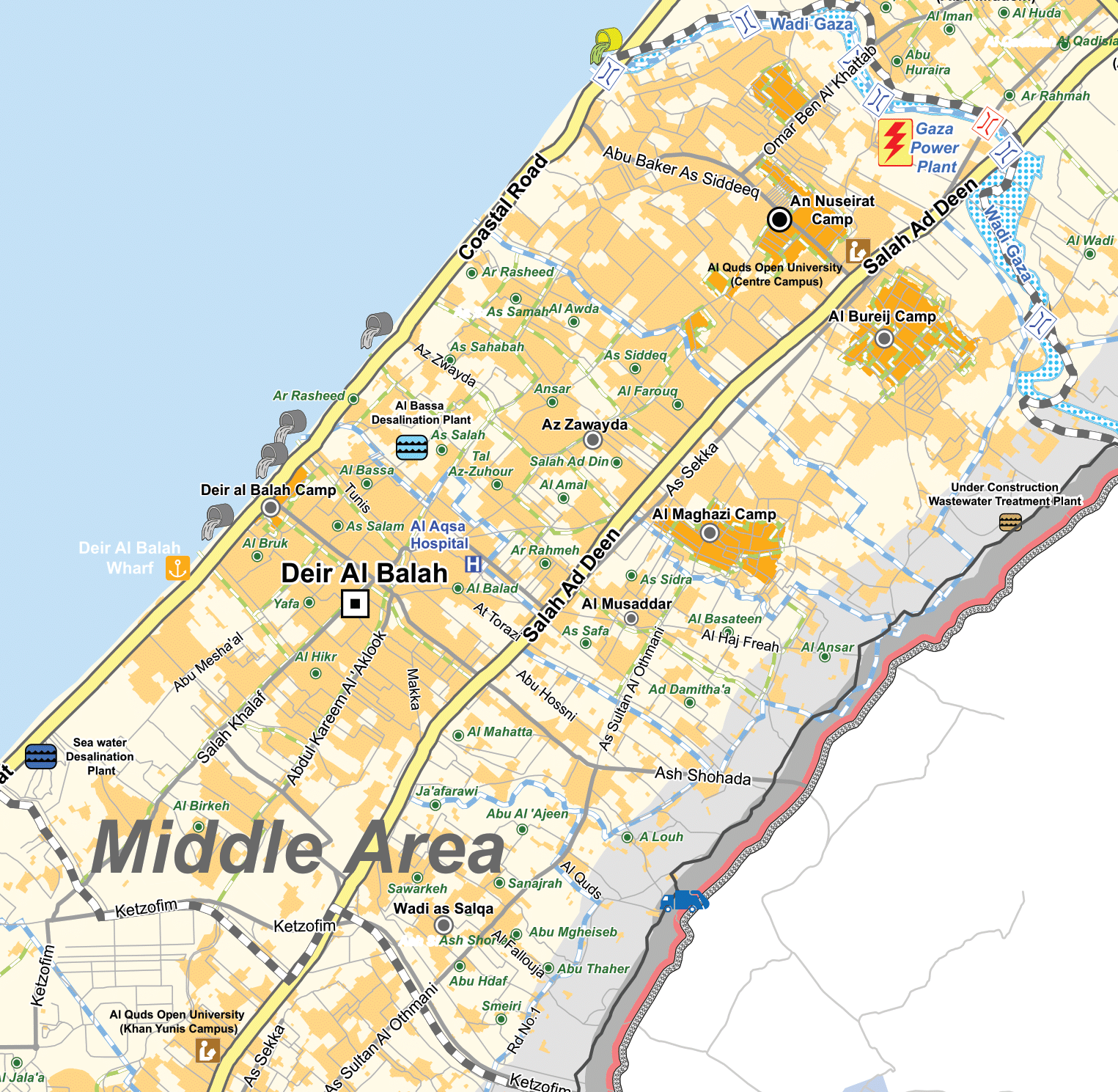
Deir al-Balah and the central Gaza Strip. Israeli-destroyed Jaffa Mosque marked as Yafa on map.

Deir al-Balah is situated in the central Gaza Strip, along the coastline of the eastern Mediterranean Sea. Its city center is about 1,700 meters (5,600 ft) east of the coast while the ancient site of Darum was uncovered 3 kilometers (1.9 mi) to the south of central Deir al-Balah. While the city's municipal borders stretch eastward toward the border with Israel, its urban area does not extend beyond the main Salah al-Din Highway to the east.

Nearby localities include Nuseirat Camp and Bureij Camp to the north, Maghazi Camp to the northeast and Wadi as-Salqa to the south. Khan Yunis is 9.7 kilometers (6.0 mi) to Deir al-Balah's south and Gaza City is located 14.6 kilometers (9.1 mi) to the north.

The city has absorbed the coastal Deir al-Balah Refugee Camp, although it remains outside of Deir al-Balah's municipal administration. While the total land area was recorded as 14,735 dunams (14.7 km^{2} or 1,473.5 hectares) in 1997, the total built-up areas of the city consist of between 7,000 and 8,000 dunams (7–8 km^{2} or 700-800 hectares.) Deir al-Balah is divided into 29 administrative areas.

== History ==
=== Late Bronze (Egyptian New Kingdom) ===
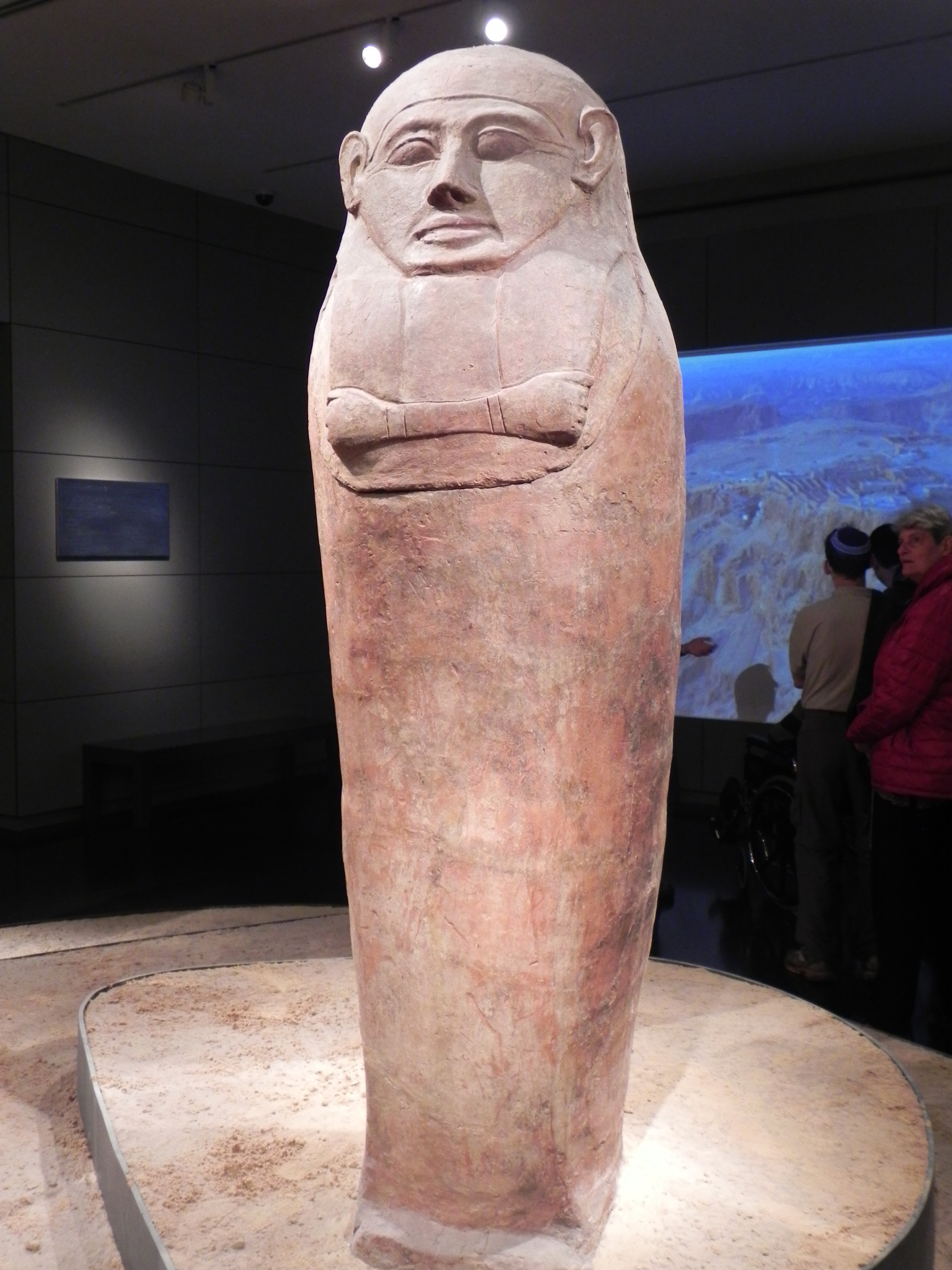
One of about fifty Late Bronze Age sarcophagi found in Deir al-Balah, some of which are on display at the Israel Museum in Jerusalem.

Deir al-Balah's history dates back to the mid-14th century BC, during the Late Bronze Age. At that time it served as an outpost in the New Kingdom of Egypt on its frontier with Canaan.

During the reign of King Ramesses II (1303–1213 BC), Deir al-Balah became the easternmost of six garrisoned fortresses in the Eastern Mediterranean. The string of fortresses began with the Sinai fort in the west, and continued through the "Way of Horus" military road to Canaan. The square-shaped fortress of Deir al-Balah had four towers at each corner and a reservoir. Archaeological findings in Deir al-Balah revealed a large ancient Egyptian cemetery with graves containing jewelry and other personal belongings. The inhabitants of the fortress employed traditional Egyptian techniques and artistic designs in their architectural works. The cosmopolitan aspect of the frontier site is proven by the rich Cypriot, Mycenaean and Minoan findings.

Similar cultural development is also attested at Tell el-Ajjul at that time, also in the Gaza strip.

=== Iron Age (Philistines) ===
Deir al-Balah remained in Egyptian hands until around 1150 BC when the Philistines conquered the southern coastal area of Canaan. The Philistine settlement is thought to have been situated southwest of the excavation site; its remains are hidden under large sand dunes. Five pits dug into the Late Bronze Age layers and containing Philistine pottery are among the few findings from that period.

=== Byzantine period ===
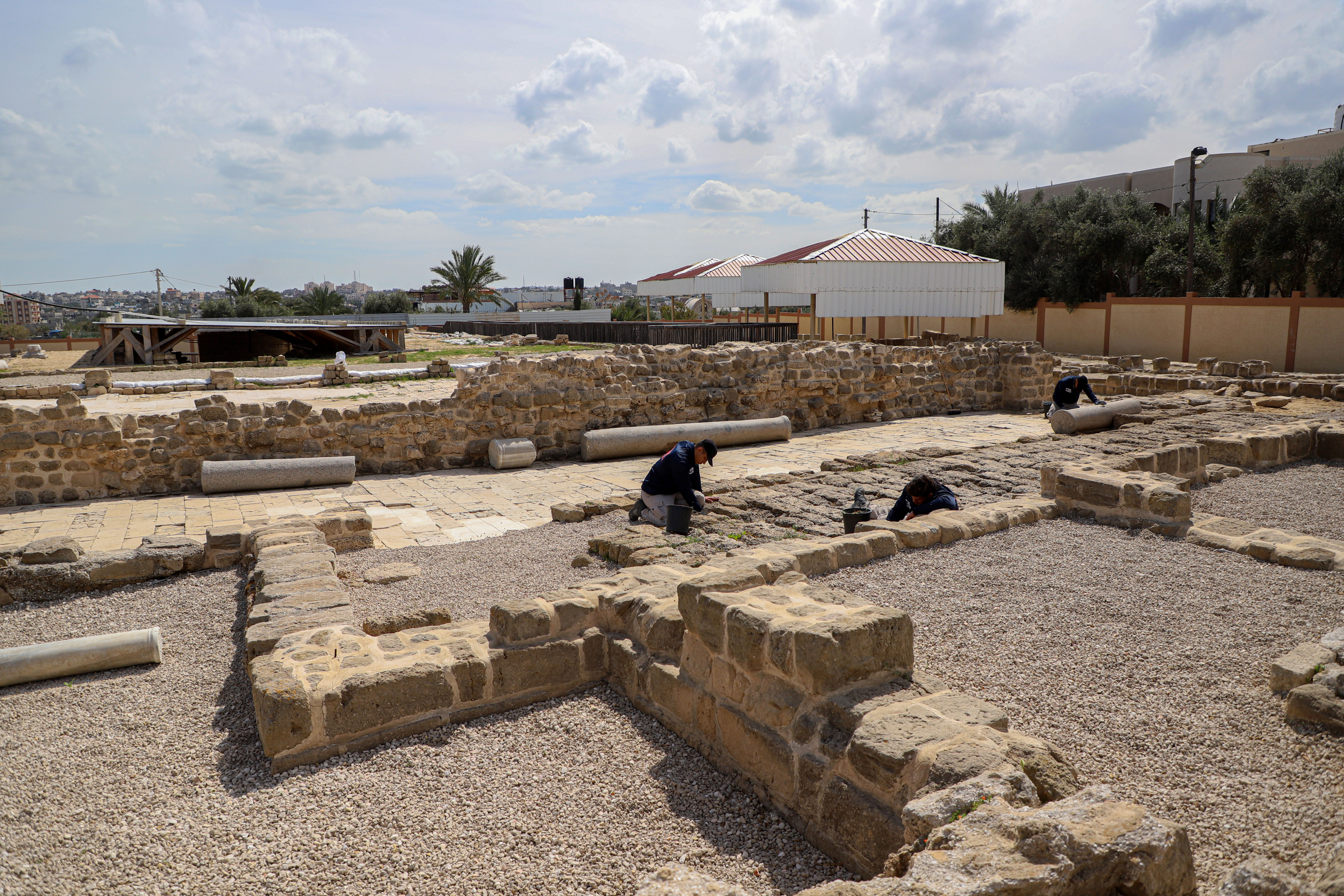
Saint Hilarion Monastery under excavation in 2023. It was designated a UNESCO World Heritage Site in 2024 and is endangered.

During Byzantine rule, the first hermitage in Palestine was established by the early Christian monk Hilarion at the site of modern-day Deir al-Balah. Hilarion initially built a small hut there, but during the reign of Constantius II (337–361) he set up the hermitage. Towards the end of his life, the monastery grew and began to attract numerous visitors. Hilarion resided at the monastery for a total of 22 years until his departure for Cyprus where he died in 371 AD. The hermitage was divided into several small cells constructed of mud brick and palm tree branches. According to local tradition and observations from Western travelers in the 19th century, the prayer hall of the Monastery of Hilarion is currently occupied by the Mosque of al-Khidr. French explorer Victor Guérin noted that two marble columns in the mosque were possibly parts of the Byzantine-era monastery.

=== Early Islamic period ===
In 632, during the early period of Islamic rule in Arabia, the Muslim commander Usama ibn Zayd launched a raid against Byzantine-held Darum, which referred not to Deir al-Balah specifically, but to the area south of Lydda which included modern-day Deir al-Balah. The site was one of the first places in Palestine to be annexed by the Rashidun Caliphate following the conquest of Gaza by Amr ibn al-'As in 634. Throughout early Muslim Arab rule and until the arrival of the Crusaders in the late 11th century, "Darum" normally referred to the southern district of Jund Filastin whose capital fluctuated between the towns of Bayt Jibrin or Hebron.

The Fatimid caliph al-Aziz Billah (r. 975-996) granted his favored vizier, Yaqub ibn Killis, a fief in modern-day Deir al-Balah, as testified by an inscription dating to the 980s located in the city's al-Khidr Mosque. The fief included a large estate with date palms.

=== Crusader and Ayyubid rule ===
Deir al-Balah was built on the ruins of the Crusader fort of Darom (also referred to as "Doron") which was built by King Amalric I. The exact date of the fort's construction is unknown, although it was likely erected after 1153 following Amalric's capture of Ascalon to the north from the Fatimid Caliphate. As described by William of Tyre, the fort was small, tantum spatium intra se continens quantum est jactus lapidis (containing inside as much space as a stone's throw) and square-shaped with four towers, one of which was larger than the others. Amalric used Darom as a launching point for several unsuccessful military campaigns against Fatimid Egypt. In addition to its role as a frontier fort on the border of Egypt, Darom also served as an administrative center charged with collecting taxes from the southern areas of the kingdom and customs from caravans and travelers coming from Egypt. It was deemed a permanent threat by the rulers of Egypt.

Not long after its construction, a small suburb or village with a church was established by local farmers and traders just outside the fort. According to medieval chronicler William of Tyre, "it was a pleasant spot where conditions of life for people of the lower ranks were better than in cities". The population of the village consisted of indigenous Eastern Orthodox Christians allied to and protected by the Crusader administration and garrison based in the fort. The inhabitants were considered lower-class, but integral members of society by the Crusaders of European or mixed descent. Because Darom was absent of Greek bishops, in 1168 Pope Alexander III gave the Latin Patriarch of Jerusalem direct jurisdiction over the dioceses, putting the largely Greek Orthodox inhabitants under the authority of the Catholic Church.

Following Amalric's withdrawal from his fifth offensive against Egypt in 1170, Muslim general Saladin, fighting on behalf of the Fatimids, attacked and besieged the fortress as part of his foray into the Crusader Kingdom of Jerusalem. Despite initial gains, Darom was not captured or destroyed. It later became a stronghold of the Knights Templar and the Knights Hospitaller from Jerusalem, led by King Baldwin III. After the Muslim army defeated the Crusaders in the decisive Battle of Hattin in 1187, their leader Saladin, by then the independent sultan of the Ayyubid dynasty, advanced south and captured both Ascalon and Darom by 1188. His first order was the fort's demolition, but he later decided against destroying it. Instead, the fortress was substantially expanded and strengthened. "Darum", which is what the Muslims called the fortress village, was encased by a wall with 17 strong towers protected by a deep moat with stone-paved sides. It hosted a garrison commanded by the emir (commander) Alam ad-Din Qaysar and served as a store for supplies and ammunition.

The Crusaders recaptured the fortress on 24 May 1191 after a short siege commanded by King Richard the Lionheart. Authority over Darum was assigned to Count Henry I of Champagne, but Richard later had the fortress demolished in July 1193 prior to withdrawing his forces from Ascalon. The Ayyubids rebuilt the fortress soon after in order to use it as a bridgehead to reconquer territories lost in Palestine during the Third Crusade. Nonetheless, in 1196, Sultan al-Aziz Uthman decided to have it demolished in case of its capture by the Crusaders. According to 15th-century historian al-Maqrizi, this decision resulted in public resentment since travelers and merchants had significantly benefited from the fort's protection. In 1226, Syrian geographer Yaqut al-Hamawi visited Darum and noted it was one of the cities of Lot and contained a ruined castle.

=== Mamluk period ===
Following its demolition, it is not known how long Darum remained deserted, but it was eventually resettled during Mamluk rule which began in 1250. For much of the Mamluk period, the town came under the administration of the politically important Niyabah of Gaza (Province of Gaza), part of the larger Mamlaka of Damascus (Kingdom of Damascus.) Along with Karatiyya and Bayt Jibrin, Darum was an amal (district) of the Province of Gaza with its own wali (governor).

It became a halting post along the newly introduced regular mail routes connecting Damascus and Cairo, which were run by horse-mounted messengers with colored sashes. Syrian historian Ibn Fadlallah al-Umari did not mention Darum in his list of the route's stopping points in 1349, instead noting that al-Salqah was the only post between Rafah and Gaza, suggesting that Darum was not a major settlement at the time. However, 14th-century Egyptian historian Ahmad al-Qalqashandi counters al-Umari's account, writing that Darum was the last halting post before Gaza. Roads, bridges, postal stations and a khan (caravanserai) were built in the town to accommodate the messengers. Pigeon mail service was introduced for which towers were built. Produce available in Darum during this time period included barley, wheat, grapes and grape leaves, olives, raspberries, lemons, figs, sweet melons, pomegranates and dates. Surrounding the town were the encampments of the Batn Jarm, an Arab clan that also lived around Gaza.

=== Ottoman period ===
Sometime prior to the Ottoman conquest of Palestine in 1516 or in the beginning years of Ottoman rule, Darum gained the additional name of "Deir" as in "Deir Darum" after its Byzantine-era monastery. The village continued to thrive during the early Ottoman era in Palestine which is attributed to the urban infrastructure originally established by the Crusaders. Its continued importance also stemmed from its close proximity to Gaza and its position on the former Via Maris trade route. The first Ottoman tax census in 1525 revealed Deir al-Balah was a relatively large village with a religiously mixed population of 87 Christian families and 56 Muslim families. In 1596 it was part of Gaza Sanjak (District of Gaza) and had a Muslim majority with 175 Muslim families and 125 Christian families. With an estimated population of 1,500, it was one of eight villages at the time to have between 1,000 and 2,000 inhabitants. Annual tax revenue from the town amounted to 17,300 akces. Pierre Jacotin named the village Deir K Helleh on his map from 1799. In 1838, Deir el-Belah was noted as a Muslim village in the Gaza district.

A substantial part of Deir al-Balah's inhabitants died in 1862 because of stagnant drinking water originating from the town's swamps. The swamps were seasonal, forming each winter as a result of flooding which failed to breach the sandstone ridge. A year later, on 29 May 1863, French explorer Victor Guérin wrote that Deir al-Balah was a small, partly ruined village with a population of 350. Date farming was the principal economic activity that the inhabitants engaged in. In 1878, the PEF's Survey of Western Palestine noted Deir al-Balah had grown to become a large village of mud houses "with wells and a small tower". At the time, it served as a see of the Greek Orthodox Church of Jerusalem.

=== WWI and British period ===
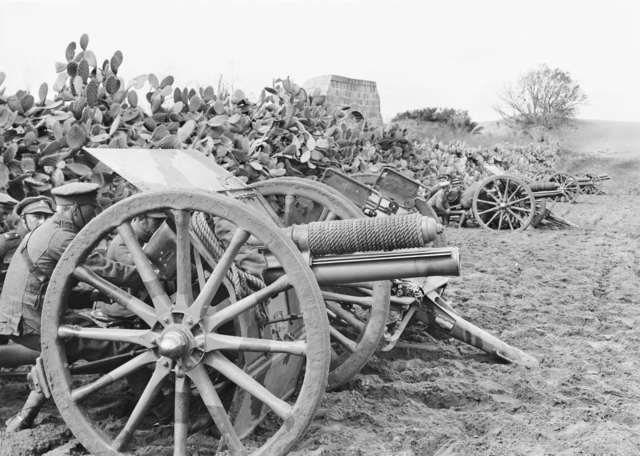
A battery of the Honourable Artillery Company outside Deir al-Balah, March 1918

Deir al-Balah was captured by the British Army following the surrender of Khan Yunis on 28 February 1917. By April an aerodrome and an army camp were established there and Deir al-Balah became a launching point for British forces against Ottoman-held Gaza and Beersheba to the north and northeast, respectively. Of the 25 British war cemeteries dating from World War I, one of the six largest was built in Deir al-Balah in March 1917. It continued to be used until March 1918 and contains a total of 724 graves.

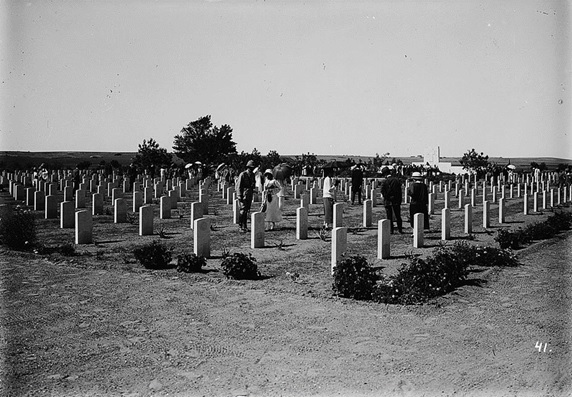
Deir al-Balah Commonwealth War Cemetery, 1918

Deir al-Balah became a part of the British Mandate of Palestine starting in 1922. A municipal council to administer the town was established by the British authorities in 1946, but it had limited jurisdiction over civil affairs and provided a few basic services.

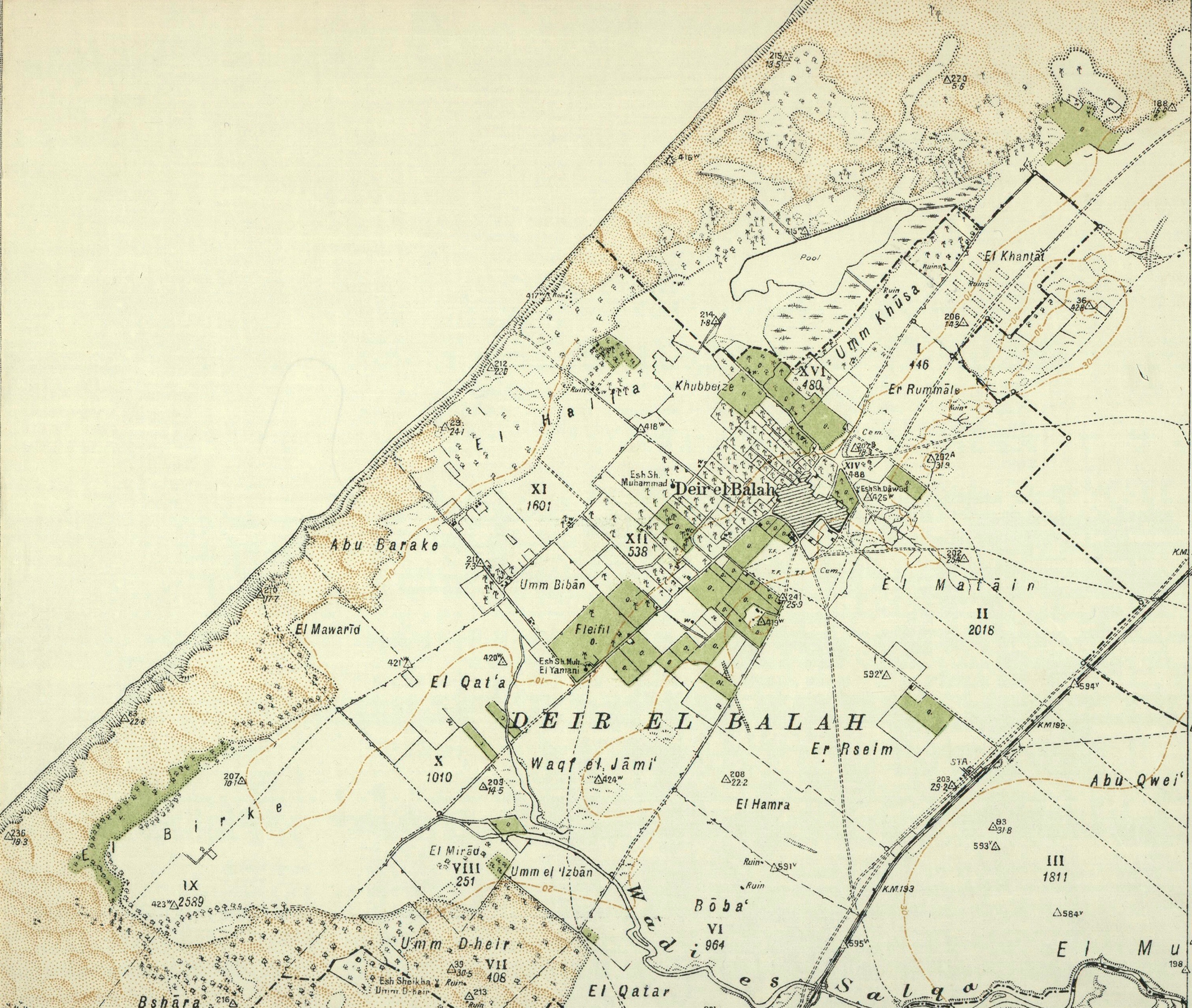
Deir el Balah 1930 1:20,000

In the 1945 statistics, Deir al-Balah had a population of 2,560; 40 Christians and 2,520 Muslims, with 14,735 dunams of land, according to an official land and population survey. Of this, 327 dunams were for citrus and bananas, 472 plantations and irrigable land, 14,438 used for cereals, while 39 dunams were built-up land.

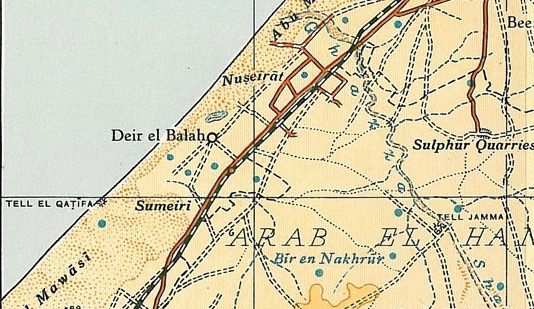
Deir el Balah 1945 1:250,000

=== 1947–1948 war and Egyptian occupation ===
In the lead-up to the 1948 Arab–Israeli War, residents of Deir al-Balah participated in a local attack against the nearby kibbutz of Kfar Darom, despite being discouraged by Egyptian Army officers, but they were repelled and suffered casualties. During the war, Egypt captured the town along with other towns in an area that became known as the Gaza Strip. The Egyptians later established a sharia court system that held jurisdiction over personal affairs. Egyptian rule introduced relative prosperity to Deir al-Balah. The town witnessed a booming citrus industry made possible by the discovery of a substantial reservoir of ground water in the vicinity. Overall, during the Egyptian occupation of Gaza citizens of the Strip were much poorer than before the partition of Palestine. The population of the strip, including Deir al-Balah swelled during this time period and the Egyptian government restricted movement to and from the Gaza Strip inhibiting its inhabitants from looking elsewhere for gainful employment or housing.

In the name of pan-Arabism, the Egyptian state officially merged with the Gaza Strip and Syria between 1959 and 1961 as part of the short-lived United Arab Republic (UAR). The project fell apart before significant integration occurred and the legal status of the Gaza Strip was mostly an afterthought during the attempt to create a unified Arab state, with the Strip and its citizens not explicitly being mentioned in the proclamation declaring the founding of the UAR or in the UAR's provisional constitution.

=== 1967 war, Israeli occupation, post-Oslo autonomy ===
During the Six-Day War in June 1967, Deir al-Balah's mayor Sulaiman al-Azayiza briefly led local resistance against the incoming Israeli Army until formally surrendering the city shortly thereafter. The Israeli authorities took control of the springs, an important irrigation source. This move combined with increasing competition from Israeli citrus farmers, damaged the local citrus industry.

After the war, a local farmer discovered a Bronze Age cemetery at Deir al-Balah and approached Moshe Dayan with the information. Dayan illicitly removed artefacts from the cemetery for his private collection, including numerous sarcophagi; scientific rescue excavations began in 1972 led by Trude Dothan and Itzhaq Beit-Arieh. The 1954 Hague Convention for the Protection of Cultural Property in the Event of Armed Conflict prohibits excavations in occupied territories except for salvage excavations. Excavations lasted until 1982 and after their the area was used for farming purposes and is now covered by vegetable gardens and fruit orchards while the main findings can be seen in Israeli museums like the Israel Museum in Jerusalem and the Hecht Museum in Haifa.

In 1982 the mayor was dismissed and the municipal council of Deir al-Balah was disbanded and replaced by an Israeli military-appointed administration. During the course of the Israeli occupation, Deir al-Balah's urban areas extended into lands designated for agriculture, largely as a result of building restrictions which hindered organized expansion.

When the First Intifada broke out in 1987, Deir al-Balah's residents participated in the uprising against Israeli rule. Around 30 residents died during the period of the Intifada, which formally ended in 1993 with the Oslo Accords between the Palestine Liberation Organization (PLO) and Israel. In 1994 Deir al-Balah was the first city to officially come under the control of the Palestinian National Authority as a result of the Gaza–Jericho Agreement.

The city has been frequently targeted in Israeli military incursions since the Second Intifada in 2000, largely due to Qassam rocket-strikes by Palestinian militants. The areas surrounding the city have also been frequent targets of razing. On 4 January 2004, Israeli authorities bulldozed around 50 dunams (5 hectares) of land in the Abu al-Ajen area east of Deir al-Balah's center. Later on 7 January, the Applied Research Institute-Jerusalem (ARIJ) reported that "Israeli bulldozers staged into al-Hikr area south of Deir el-Balah city under heavy barrage of gunfire and razed 70 dunams (7 hectares) of land planted with guava and orange groves owned by the Abu Holy and Abu Reziq families."

During factional clashes across the Gaza Strip in June 2007 which ended with Hamas gaining control over that territory, at least four paramilitaries from Hamas and Fatah were killed in Deir al-Balah. On 2 January 2009, Deir al-Balah was shelled by the Israeli Army as part of its month-long offensive Operation Cast Lead.

=== Gaza war (2023–present) ===
In the beginning of December, during the second month of the Gaza war, IDF tanks cut off the passage from Khan Yunis to Deir al-Balah. The IDF campaign, which was intended to target members of Hamas in the center region of the Gaza Strip, brought down multiple apartment buildings. While resulting in the death of a Hamas commander, the bombing campaign has overwhelmed the Shuhada Al-Aqsa Hospital staff with patients. Doctors described the bombing campaign on December 3 as a bloody day.

In December 2023, the Jaffa Mosque (Arabic: مَسْجِد يَافَا, romanized: Masjid Yāfā) was destroyed by Israeli bombardment in Deir al-Balah (31.4156°N 34.351°E).

In July 2025, the IDF began a ground advance towards Deir al-Balah for the first time during the war.

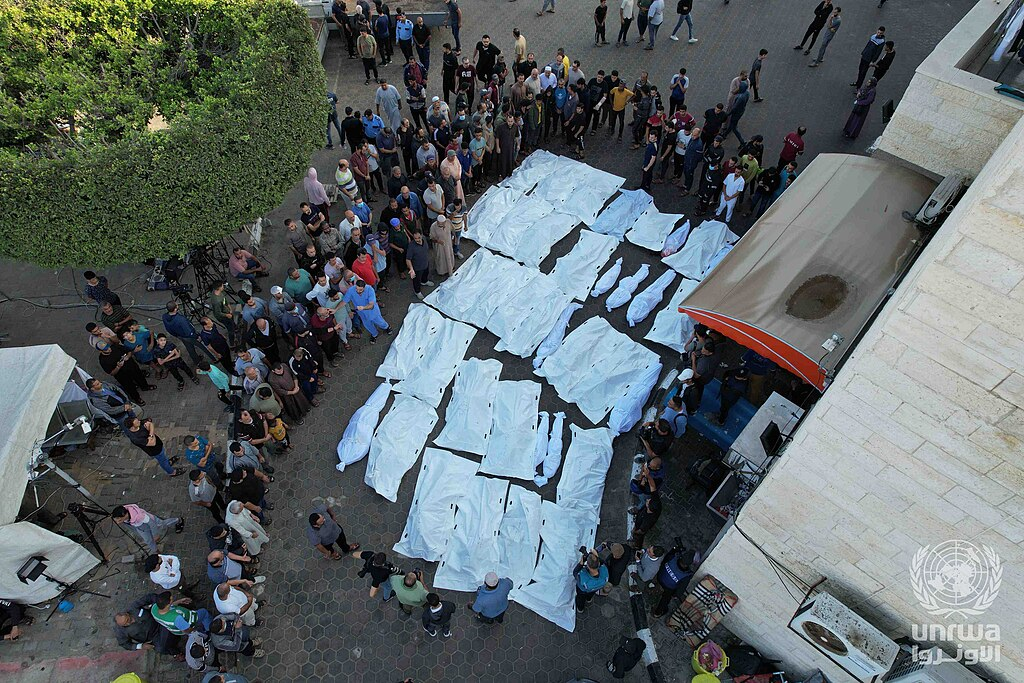
Bodies of people killed during the Gaza war. Al-Aqsa Martyrs Hospital, 6th of November 2023.

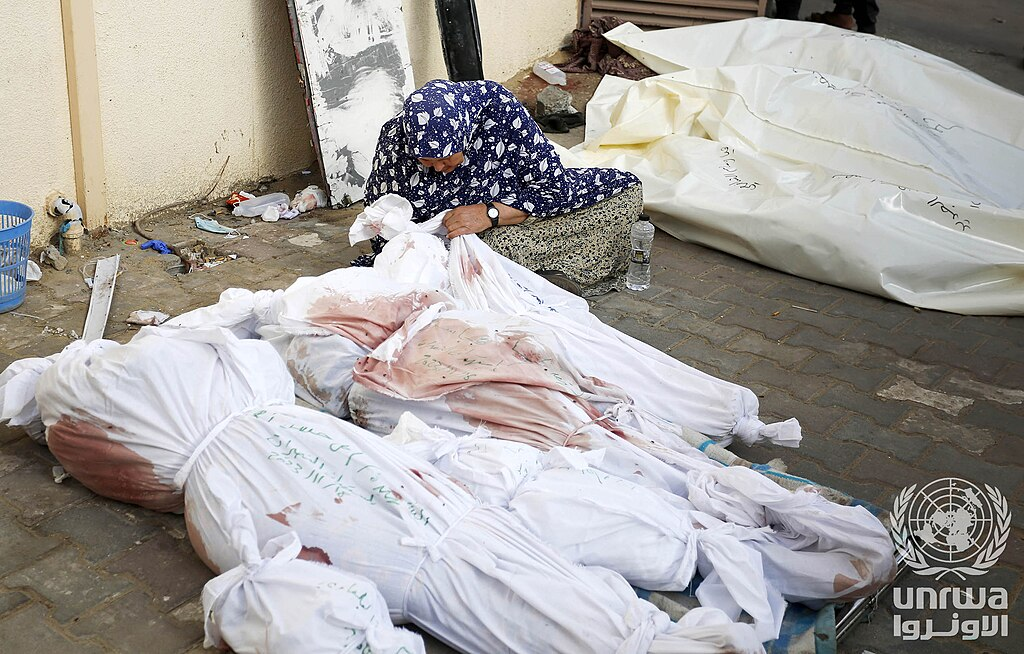
A Palestinian woman mourn her relatives killed in the Israeli airstrike of Deir el-Balah, Gaza Strip in 2023.

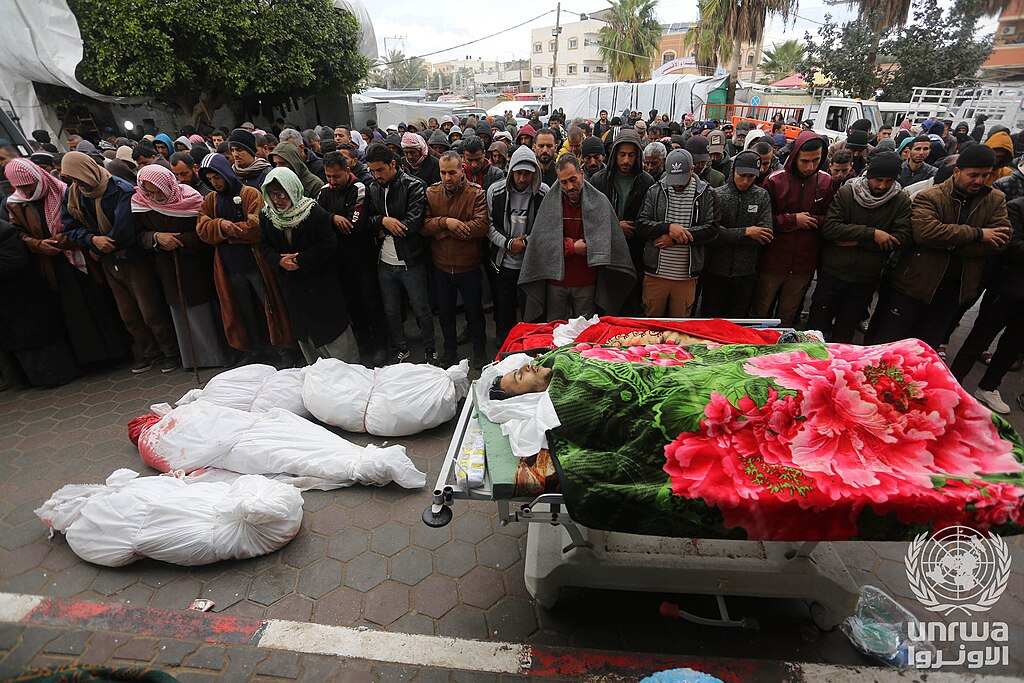
Palestinians bid farewell to their relatives who were killed in an Israeli airstrike of Deir el-Balah, 2024.

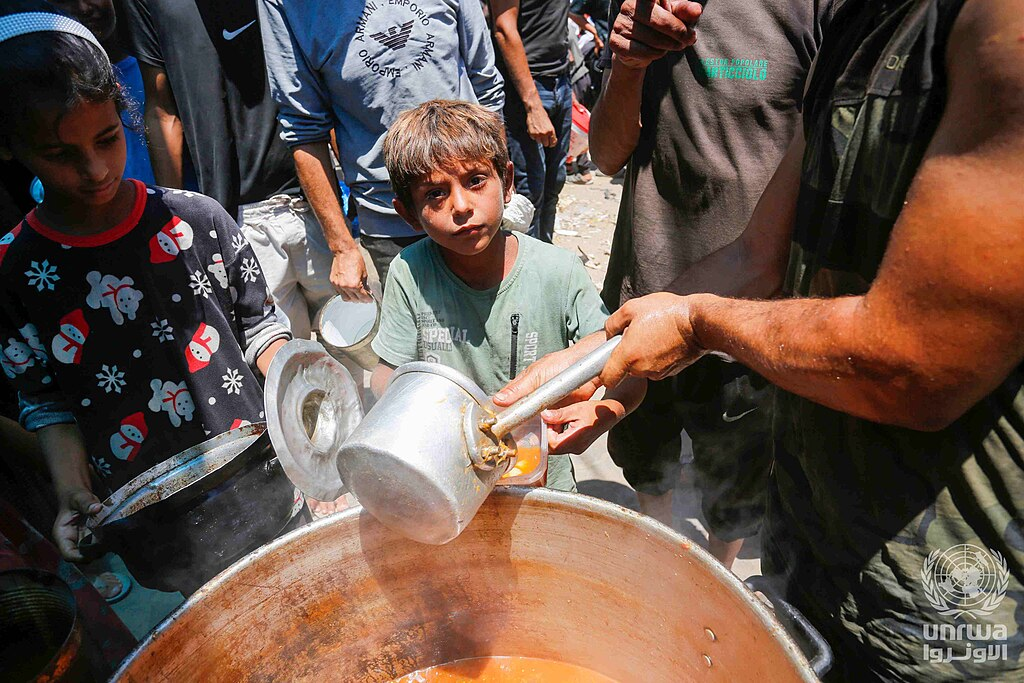
A local charity kitchen distributes a basic warm meal to Palestinians in Deir al-Balah, June 2024

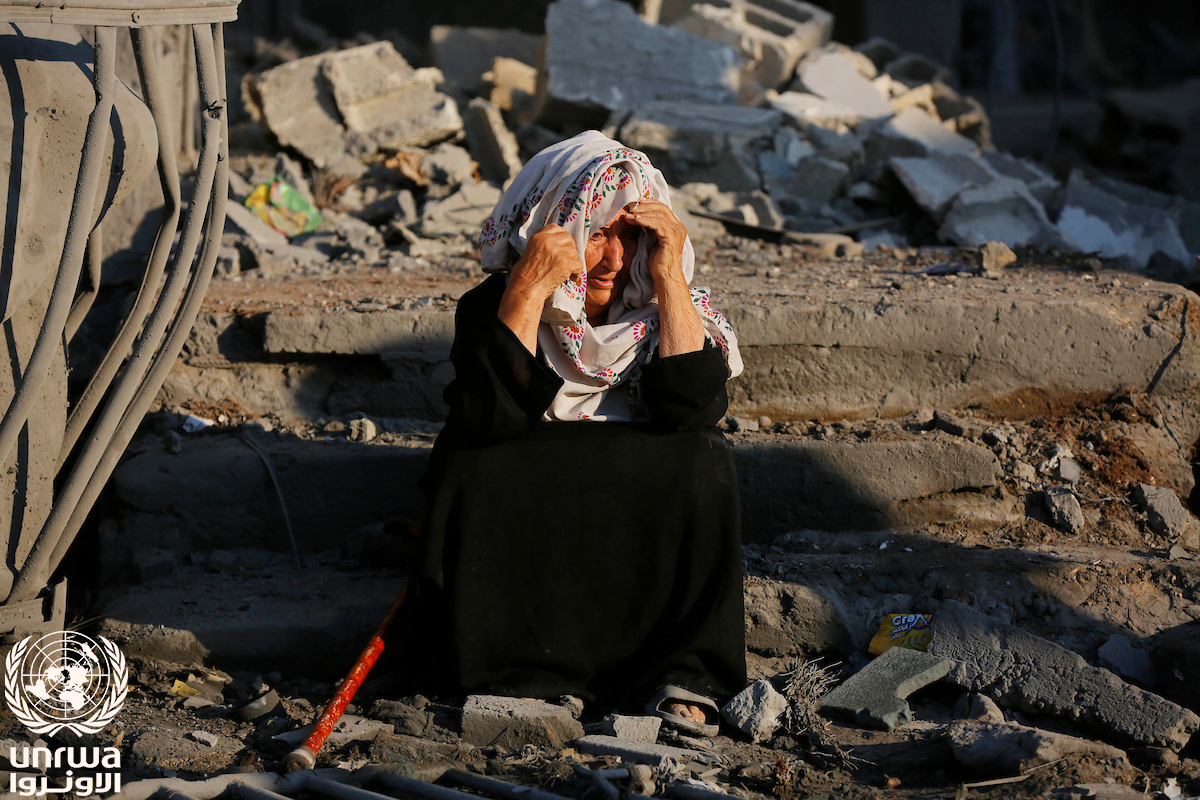
An elderly Palestinian woman sitting on the rubble of her home, destroyed by Israeli bombardment (Summer 2024)

== Archaeology ==
White marble pillar shafts were built into the walls of some houses in old Deir al-Balah. They resembled the medieval-era pillars in the Temple Mount ("Haram ash-Sharif") in Jerusalem.

=== Mosque of al-Khidr ===
The Mosque of al-Khidr (also called "Maqam al-Khader") is 24.3 feet (7.4 m) by 53.4 feet (16.3 m) and was built on the site of a Byzantine monastery. The northern and southern walls were buttressed and the eastern wall has three apses. The Survey of Western Palestine related in 1875 that there were Greek inscriptions on one of the steps leading to the door at the southern wall while on the floor was a broken stone slab marked by two Maltese crosses, apparently resembling a tombstone. Further slabs and Greek inscriptions were found in the eastern part of the mosque and in the courtyard. In the center is a tomb made of modern masonry that tradition claims is the tomb of Saint George ("Mar Jirjis") or al-Khidr, as he is known in Arabic.

Prior to the predominance of orthodox Islam in Palestine, the region contained numerous domed structures dedicated to Muslim patron saints, among which was the Mosque of al-Khidr in Deir al-Balah. In March 2016, the Ministry of Tourism and Antiquities in the Gaza Strip began the restoration of the Mosque of al-Khidr with financial support from UNESCO and the Nawa Foundation. The project aims to convert the mosque-tomb into a children's cultural library.

== Demographics ==
Year	Type	Population
1596	Defter	1,500;
1863	Estimate	350
1870	Census	792
1922	Census	916
1931	Census	1,587
1945	Survey	2,560
1982	Census	15,100
1997	Census	42,839 (with Camp)
2007	Census	54,439

According to a census conducted in 1922 by the British Mandate authorities, Deir al-Balah had a population of 916 inhabitants (893 Muslims, 22 Jews and one Christian). The census of 1931 lists 1,587 inhabitants (1,577 Muslims and 10 Christians). The village statistics of 1938 list the population as 1,823. With a population of 2,560 (2,520 Muslims and 40 Christians) in 1945, Deir al-Balah was a relatively large village. The influx of Palestinian refugees from nearby areas captured by Israel during the 1948 War drastically increased the population thereafter. In the 1997 census by the Palestinian Central Bureau of Statistics (PCBS) Deir al-Balah's population was recorded as 42,839, a figure which included the adjacent Deir al-Balah Camp (the smallest refugee camp in the Gaza Strip.) Nearly 75% of the population were below the age of 30.

In 2004 the PCBS estimated the population to be 46,159. In the 2007 census by the PCBS, the population of Deir al-Balah city alone was 54,439, making it the largest municipality in the Deir al-Balah Governorate. The camp's population was 6,438. However, Nuseirat combined with its refugee camp has a larger population than Deir al-Balah combined with its camp. There were a total of 8,395 households and the average family size consisted of between six and seven members. The gender distribution in the city was 50.3% male and 49.7% female.

Deir al-Balah's entire population is Muslim. A sizable Greek Orthodox Christian population existed until the mid-19th century. In the 1931 British census of Palestine, there were only 10 Christians in Deir al-Balah out of a population of 1,587. Today, refugees make up the majority of the population, accounting for over 66% of the city's inhabitants in 1997. However, this figure also included the Deir al-Balah Camp.

== Economy ==
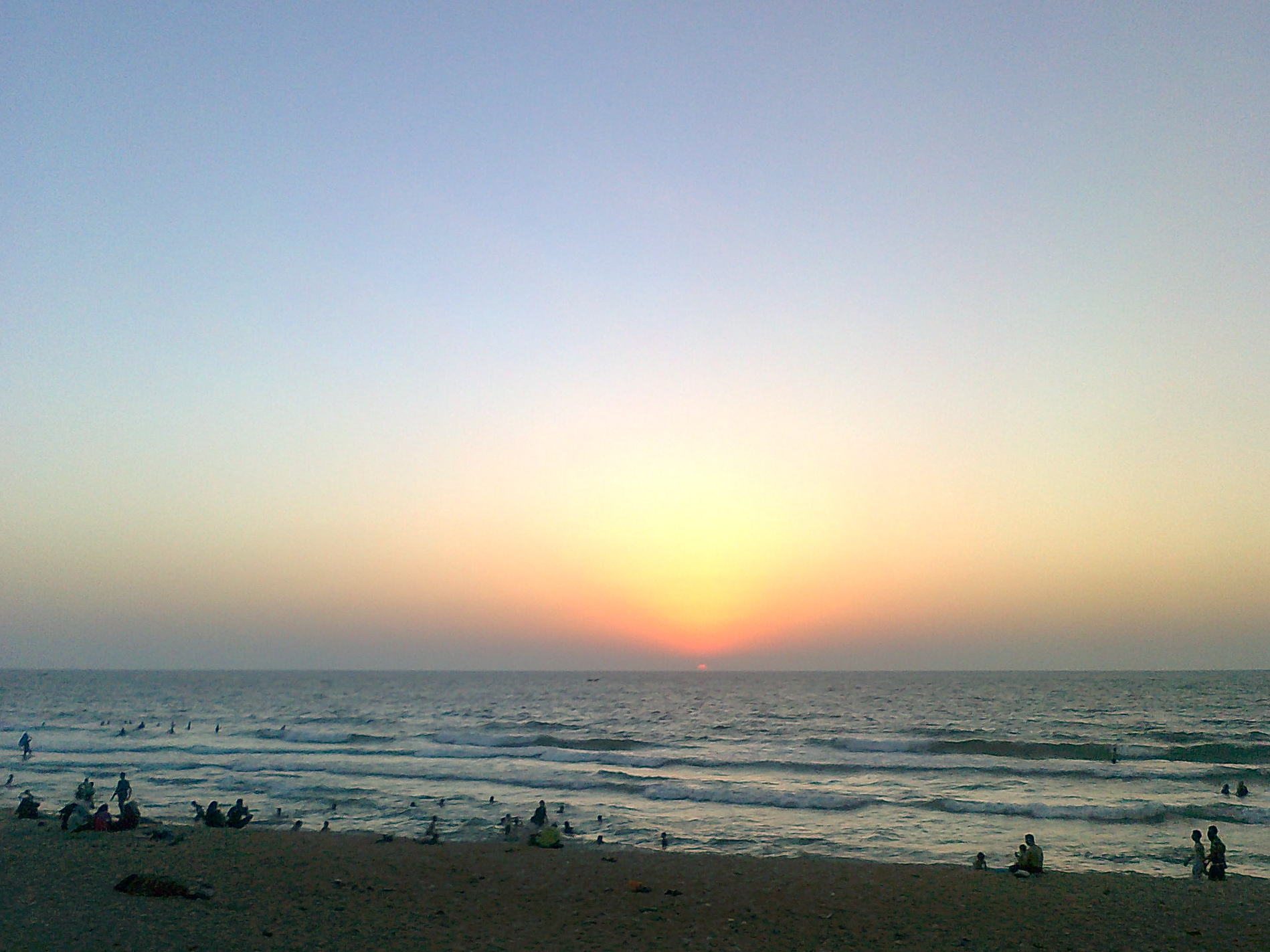
The beach at Deir al-Balah, 2012

The Deir al-Balah Governorate's principal economic activity is services, accounting for 67.4% of the labor force. Commerce, hospitality and retail account for 12.9%, agriculture and fishing 10.1%, transportation and communication 5.4% and manufacturing 3.4%. In 2009 the unemployment rate in the governorate was 35.2% while the labor force participation rate was 38.7%. In 2007 there were 1,108 business establishments in the city.

=== Agriculture and fishing ===
Deir al-Balah is well known for growing date palms, an estimated 20,000 of which covered the landscape south and west of the city in the 1990s. However, some 3,550 trees were uprooted or bulldozed by the Israeli Army in the early years of the Second Intifada beginning in 2000. There were an estimated 16,500 palms in Deir al-Balah in 2003. In addition to being a local delicacy, date cultivation constitutes one of the principal sources of income for many of Deir al-Balah's residents. The particular type of date that is cultivated in the area is known as "Hayani." It has a distinctly red color. Other leading agricultural products cultivated in Deir al-Balah include citrus, almonds, pomegranates and grapes.

The city has a small fishing industry and is the site of one of four wharfs in the Gaza Strip. In 2007 there were about 76 active fishing vessels employed by 550 fishermen. From 2000 to 2006, during the Second Intifada, income from fishing was halved. In order to alleviate losses resulting from a 10 kilometers (6.2 mi) fishing limit off the coast imposed by the Israeli Navy following Hamas's victory in the 2006 parliamentary elections, the Palestinian Authority Department of Fisheries has sought to construct eight artificial reefs in both Deir al-Balah and Gaza City.

== Education ==
According to the 1997 PCBS census, 87.7% of residents in Deir al-Balah over the age of 10 were literate. The number of people who finished elementary education was 5,740, while 5,964 finished primary education and 5,289 completed secondary school. In higher education, 1,763 people attained associate degrees, 1,336 attained bachelor's degrees and 97 attained higher degrees.

Educational services in Deir al-Balah are under the jurisdiction of the Khan Yunis Directorate of Higher Education. There were a total of 85 schools in the Deir al-Balah Governorate in 2007-08 according to the PNA's Ministry of Education and Higher Education. The Palestinian government operated 39 school while four were privately owned. The remainder were run by UNRWA and were mostly located in refugee camps in Deir al-Balah's vicinity. The total number of students in the governorate was 67,693, of which 50.3% were male 49.7% female.

The Palestine Technical College, a vocational and technical college founded in 1992, is located in Deir al-Balah. A library was added to the campus in 1998.

== Government ==
Deir al-Balah's first village council was established in 1946 and an elected local government continued to administer the city until 1982 when the Israeli military authorities dissolved the council and appointed a mayor. In 1994 Deir al-Balah gained the status of a city by the Palestinian Authority (PNA). The Palestinian president, Yasser Arafat, appointed Samir Mohammed Azayiza as mayor until 2000 when he replaced him with Sami Abu Salim, a wealthy businessman from the city. The services and functions of the municipality include city planning, infrastructure maintenance and repair, providing utilities, school administration and garbage collection.

A 15-member municipal council currently administers Deir al-Balah. Although thought to be a stronghold of Fatah, Hamas members defeated Fatah's candidates in the 2005 Palestinian municipal elections by a large margin, taking 13 seats. Despite their political affiliations, all candidates ran as Independents. Two female candidates also gained seats. Local sheikh, school operator and Hamas member Ahmad Harb Kurd garnered the most votes.

=== Mayors ===
- Sulaiman al-'Azayiza (at least 1967–1982)
- Israeli Military Governor (1982–1994)
- Samir Mohammed 'Azayiza (1994–2000)
- Sami Abu Salim (2000–2005)
- Ahmad Kurd (2005–2020)

== Notable people ==
- Renad Attallah, social media influencer and chef (born 2014)

== See also ==
- Hanajira

== Bibliography ==
- Barron, J.B., ed. (1923). Palestine: Report and General Abstracts of the Census of 1922. Government of Palestine.
- Bitton-Ashkeloni, Bruria (2004). Christian Gaza In Late Antiquity. BRILL. ISBN 9004138684.
- Bunson, Margaret (2002). Encyclopedia of Ancient Egypt. Infobase Publishing. ISBN 1438109970.
- Burgel, J. Christoph (1985). Islam in the Mirror of Contemporary Literature of the Islamic World. BRILL Archive. ISBN 9004077073.
- Caridi, Paola (2012). Hamas: From Resistance to Government. Seven Stories Press. ISBN 978-1609800833.
- Conder, C.R.; Kitchener, H.H. (1883). The Survey of Western Palestine: Memoirs of the Topography, Orography, Hydrography, and Archaeology. Vol. 3. London: Committee of the Palestine Exploration Fund.
- Department of Statistics (1945). Village Statistics, April, 1945. Government of Palestine.
- Guérin, V. (1869). Description Géographique Historique et Archéologique de la Palestine (in French). Vol. 1: Judee, pt. 2. Paris: L'Imprimerie Nationale.
- el-Eini, Roza (2006). Mandated Landscape: British Imperial Rule in Palestine, 1929–1948. Psychology Press. ISBN 0714654264.
- Ellenblum, R. (2003). Frankish Rural Settlement in the Latin Kingdom of Jerusalem. Cambridge University Press. ISBN 9780521521871.
- Hadawi, S. (1970). Village Statistics of 1945: A Classification of Land and Area ownership in Palestine. Palestine Liberation Organization Research Center. Archived from the original on 2018-12-08.
- Hartmann, M. (1883). "Die Ortschaftenliste des Liwa Jerusalem in dem türkischen Staatskalender für Syrien auf das Jahr 1288 der Flucht (1871)". Zeitschrift des Deutschen Palästina-Vereins. 6: 102–149.
- Hütteroth, W.-D.; Abdulfattah, K. (1977). Historical Geography of Palestine, Transjordan and Southern Syria in the Late 16th Century. Erlanger Geographische Arbeiten, Sonderband 5. Erlangen, Germany: Vorstand der Fränkischen Geographischen Gesellschaft. ISBN 3-920405-41-2.
- Karmon, Y. (1960). "An Analysis of Jacotin's Map of Palestine" (PDF). Israel Exploration Journal. 10 (3, 4): 155–173, 244–253. Archived from the original (PDF) on 2019-12-22.
- Lesch, Ann Mosely (1980). Political Perceptions of the Palestinians on the West Bank and the Gaza Strip. Middle East Institute. ISBN 0916808173.
- Lipinsky, E. (1985). The Land of Israel: Cross-roads of Civilizations. Peeters Publishers. ISBN 9068310313.
- Le Strange, G. (1890). Palestine Under the Moslems: A Description of Syria and the Holy Land from A.D. 650 to 1500. Committee of the Palestine Exploration Fund.
- Mattar, P. (2005). Encyclopedia of the Palestinians. Infobase Publishing. ISBN 0816069867.
- Middle East Review. Kogan Page Publishers. 1993. ISBN 074944066X.
- Mills, E., ed. (1932). Census of Palestine 1931. Population of Villages, Towns and Administrative Areas. Jerusalem: Government of Palestine.
- Morkot, R. (2003). Historical Dictionary of Ancient Egyptian Warfare. Scarecrow Press. ISBN 0810848627.
- Mukaddasi (1886). Description of Syria, including Palestine. London: Palestine Pilgrims' Text Society. (p. 53)
- Orni, Efraim (1973). Geography of Israel. Jewish Publication Society of America. ISBN 0827600062.
- Petersen, Andrew (2005). The Towns of Palestine Under Muslim Rule. British Archaeological Reports. ISBN 1841718211.
- Pringle, D. (1993). The Churches of the Crusader Kingdom of Jerusalem: A–K (excluding Acre and Jerusalem). Cambridge University Press. ISBN 0521390362.
- Robinson, E.; Smith, E. (1841). Biblical Researches in Palestine, Mount Sinai and Arabia Petraea: A Journal of Travels in the year 1838. Vol. 3. Boston: Crocker & Brewster.
- Roy, S. (1986). The Gaza Strip: A Demographic, Economic, Social, and Legal Survey. Westview Press. ISBN 0813304741.
- Schick, Robert (1995). The Christian Communities of Palestine From Byzantine to Islamic Rule. Darwin Press. ISBN 0878500812.
- Shahin, Mariam (2005). Palestine: A Guide. Interlink Books. ISBN 1-56656-557-X.
- Shahwan, Usama Salim (2003). Public Administration in Palestine: Past and Present. University Press of America. ISBN 0761826882.
- Sharon, M. (2004). Corpus Inscriptionum Arabicarum Palaestinae, D-F. Vol. 3. BRILL. ISBN 90-04-13197-3.
- Socin, A. (1879). "Alphabetisches Verzeichniss von Ortschaften des Paschalik Jerusalem". Zeitschrift des Deutschen Palästina-Vereins. 2: 135–163.
- Ziadeh, Nicola A. (1953). Urban Life In Syria Under the Early Mamluks. Greenwood Press. ISBN 9780837131627.
