= Shokat as-Sufi =

Town in Gaza Strip

- Municipality type C

Arabic transcription(s)
  - Latin: Shoka (official)
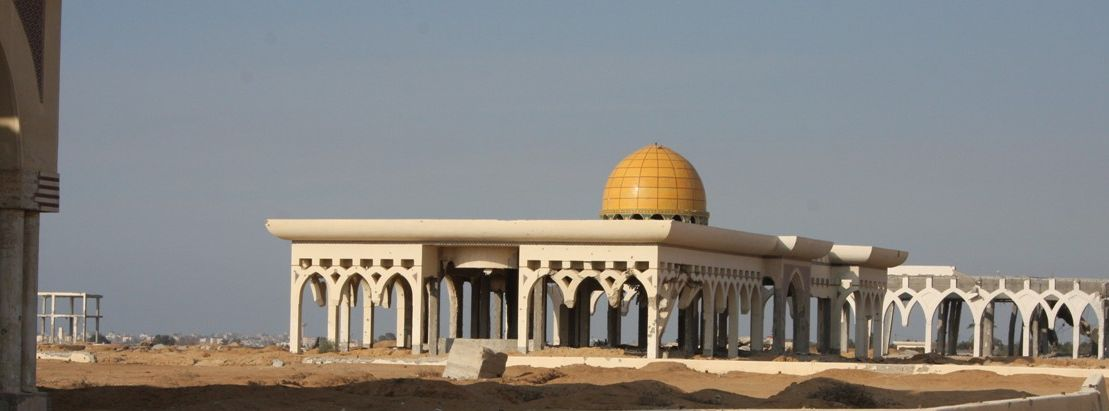
- Ruins of Yasser Arafat Int'l Airport

- Location of Shokat as-Sufi within Palestine
- Coordinates: 31°15′31.12″N 34°16′56.80″E
- State: State of Palestine
- Governorate: Rafah

Government
  - Type: Municipality (from 2005)
  - Head of Municipality: Mousa Abu Jlaidan

Population (2017)
  - Total: 16,445

Shokat as-Sufi (Arabic: شوكة الصوفي) is a Palestinian town under Israeli occupation in the southern Gaza Strip, south of Rafah and adjacent to the inoperable Yasser Arafat International Airport. It is one of the poorest localities in the Gaza Strip, and has underdeveloped infrastructure.

According to the Palestinian Central Bureau of Statistics (PCBS) census in 1997, Shokat as-Sufi had a population of 5,663 of which 90% were Palestinian refugees. The gender make-up of the town was 49.3% male and 50.7% female. According to the PCBS, in 2017, it had a population of 16,445.

Shokat as-Sufi is governed by a municipal council of eleven members including the mayor, who since 2005 has been Mousa Abu Jlaidan.
