= Juhor ad-Dik =

- Municipality type D (Village council)

Arabic transcription(s)
  - Arabic: جحر الديك
  - Latin: Juhar ad-Deek (official)
- Interactive map of Juhor ad-Dik
- Coordinates: 31°27′25″N 34°26′24″E
- State: State of Palestine
- Governorate: Gaza

Government
  - Type: Village council

Population (2017)
  - Total: 4,586

Juhor ad-Dik (Arabic: جحر الديك, lit. 'burrow of the cock') is a Palestinian farming village in the Gaza Governorate, south of Gaza City, in the central Gaza Strip. According to the Palestinian Central Bureau of Statistics (PCBS), the village had a population of 4,586 inhabitants in 2017. This area was controlled by Israel during Gaza war. In May, 2024, the Washington Post reported that the village had been destroyed in order to construct the Netzarim Corridor.

== History ==
=== 2009 Israeli invasion ===
During Israel's 2009 invasion of the Gaza Strip, Israeli troops and Palestinian militiamen battled frequently in Juhor ad-Dik, with over 100 of the village's houses having been bulldozed by Israeli forces by the end of the conflict.

=== 2014 Israeli invasion ===
The village suffered greatly during the 2014 Gaza war, with many of its buildings reduced to ruins. In January 2015, according to The New Arab, there was "not a house left standing" in the village in the aftermath of the war. Israeli NGO Breaking the Silence published an anonymous interview with a first sergeant in the IDF's Armored Corps, who recounted his unit's wholesale destruction of houses and trees in the village using IDF Caterpillar D9 bulldozers.

=== 2014–2023 ===
The northern Gaza Strip's largest landfill is located in the Juhor ad-Dik area, about 500 meters from the Gaza border fence. In September 2023, a severe heat wave caused the outbreak of a fire at the landfill site that lasted several days. Amid the Gaza war, waste began accumulating throughout the streets of Gaza City, as municipal garbagemen were unable to transport it to the Juhor ad-Dik landfill site due to heavy Israeli bombardment.

=== 2023 Israeli invasion ===
Following the October 7 attacks on Israel, on 28 October 2023, an IDF raid maneuvered into the Gaza Strip east of al-Bureij refugee camp, in the Juhor ad-Dik area. During the Israeli invasion of the Gaza Strip, Israeli infantry and armour near Juhor ad-Dik were frequently the targets of ambushes, mortar attacks, and anti-tank fire by Hamas's Izz al-Din al-Qassam Brigades. In June 2024, the IDF reported it had destroyed a 800-meter-long tunnel in the Juhor ad-Dik area. The tunnel, reportedly, 30 meters deep, had several rooms and blast doors, and had been used by Hamas operatives. As of 2026, Juhor ad-Dik remains destroyed and under IDF control.

== Demographics ==
In the 1997 census by the PCBS, Palestinian refugees made up 72.3% of the population which at the time was 2,275.
