= Wadi as-Salqa =

- Municipality type C

Arabic transcription(s)
  - Arabic: وادي السلقا
  - Latin: Wadi al-Salqa (official); Wadi as-Salka (unofficial)
- Location of Wadi as-Salqa within Palestine
- Coordinates: 31°23′18″N 34°21′23″E
- State: State of Palestine
- Governorate: Deir al-Balah

Government
  - Type: Municipality
  - Control: Hamas
  - Head of Municipality: Yousef Abul Ajeen

Population (2017)
  - Total: 6,715

Wadi as-Salqa (Arabic: وادي السلقا) is a Palestinian agricultural town in the Deir al-Balah Governorate, located south of Deir al-Balah. According to the Palestinian Central Bureau of Statistics (PCBS), the municipality had a population of 6,715 in 2017. The area is known to have a high flood risk.

Over half of the inhabitants are below the age of 18. Due to the economic sanctions on the Gaza Strip following Hamas' victory in the Palestinian National Authority's legislative elections in 2006, about 85% of Wadi as-Salqa's population lived under the poverty line.

During the Israel-Hamas war, 4,000 displaced families sought refuge in the area, establishing a tent camp.
