= 2018–2019 Gaza border protests =

Political demonstrations in Gaza

- Part of the Gaza–Israel conflict
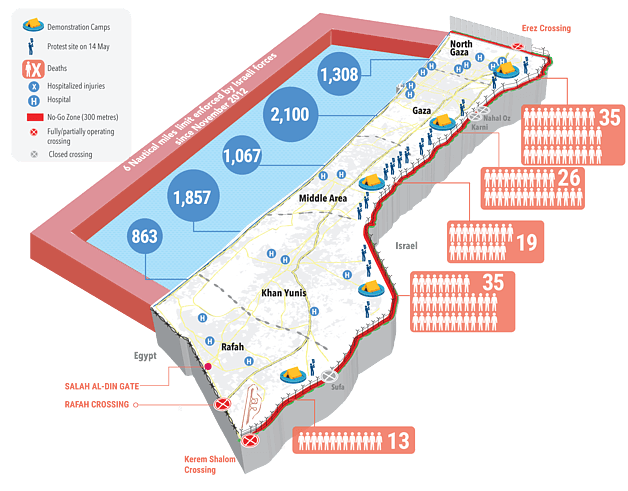
- UN OCHA map of the protests, 31 May 2018
- Date: 30 March 2018 – 27 December 2019 (1 year, 8 months, 3 weeks and 6 days)
- Location: Gaza Strip, near the Israeli border
- Caused by: Donald Trump's decision to move the Embassy of the United States to Jerusalem
- Goals: Lifting of the Israeli blockade on Gaza; Achieving the Palestinian right of return
- Concessions: None

Parties
| Gaza Strip: Democratic Front for the Liberation of Palestine (DFLP); Hamas; Palestinian Islamic Jihad (PIJ); Popular Front for the Liberation of Palestine (PFLP); Unaffiliated protesters | Israel: Israel Defense Forces; Israel Border Police |

Casualties and losses
| 223 killed (including 46 children); 36,142 injured | 0 or 1 killed 4 or 11 wounded: 6 soldiers; 5 civilians |

The 2018–2019 Gaza border protests, also known as the Great March of Return (Arabic: مسیرة العودة الكبرى, romanized: Masīra al-ʿawda al-kubrā), were a series of demonstrations held each Friday in the Gaza Strip near the Gaza–Israel barrier from 30 March 2018 until 27 December 2019, in which Israel killed a total of 223 Palestinians. The demonstrators demanded that the Palestinian refugees must be allowed to return to lands they were displaced from in territory that was Mandatory Palestine and is now Israel. They protested against Israel's land, air and sea blockade of Gaza and the United States recognition of Jerusalem as capital of Israel.

The first demonstrations were organized by independent activists, but the initiative was soon endorsed by Hamas, the governing party of Gaza, as well as other major factions in Gaza. The activists who planned the Great March of Return intended it to last only from 30 March 2018 (Land Day) to 15 May (Nakba Day) but the demonstrations continued for almost 18 months until the organizing committee for the Great March of Return announced on 27 December 2019 that they would be postponed. Thirty thousand Palestinians participated in the first demonstration on 30 March. Larger protests took place on the following Fridays, 6 April, 13 April, 20 April, 27 April, 4 May, and 11 May — each of which involved at least 10,000 demonstrators — while smaller numbers attended activities during the week.

Most of the demonstrators demonstrated peacefully far from the border fence. Peter Cammack, a fellow with the Middle East Program at the Carnegie Endowment for International Peace, argued that the march indicated a new trend in Palestinian society and Hamas, with a shift away from violence towards non-violent forms of protest. Nevertheless, smaller groups attempted to breach the fence, rolling tires, and throwing stones and molotov cocktails. Israeli officials said the demonstrations were used by Hamas as cover for launching attacks against Israel.

At least 189 Palestinians were killed between 30 March and 31 December 2018. Afterwards, an independent United Nations commission said that at least 29 out of the 189 killed were militants. Israeli soldiers fired tear gas and live ammunition. According to Robert Mardini, head of Middle East for the International Committee of the Red Cross (ICRC), more than 13,000 Palestinians were wounded as of 19 June 2018. The majority were wounded severely, with some 1,400 struck by three to five bullets. No Israelis were physically harmed from 30 March to 12 May, until one Israeli soldier was reported as slightly wounded on 14 May, the day the protests peaked. The same day, 59 or 60 Palestinians were shot dead at twelve clash points along the border fence. Hamas claimed 50 of them as its militants, and Islamic Jihad claimed 3 of the 62 killed as members of its military wing. Some 35,000 Palestinians protested that day, with thousands approaching the fence.

Israel's use of deadly force was condemned on 13 June 2018 in a United Nations General Assembly resolution. Condemnations also came from human rights organizations, including Human Rights Watch, B'Tselem, and Amnesty International, and by United Nations officials. Kuwait proposed two United Nations Security Council statements, both blocked by the United States, which called for investigations into Israel's killing of Palestinian protesters. The Israeli government praised Israeli troops for protecting the border fence. Media coverage of the demonstrations, and what has been termed the "PR battle", has been the object of analysis and controversy. In late February 2019, a United Nations Human Rights Council's independent commission found that of the 489 cases of Palestinian deaths or injuries analyzed, only two were possibly justified as responses to danger by Israeli security forces. The commission deemed the rest of the cases illegal, and concluded with a recommendation calling on Israel to examine whether war crimes or crimes against humanity had been committed, and if so, to bring those responsible to trial. Over 7,000 live ammunition injuries were to limbs, with 156 resulting in amputations. The WHO estimates that over 1,200 limb injuries would need specialized limb reconstruction treatment.

== Background ==
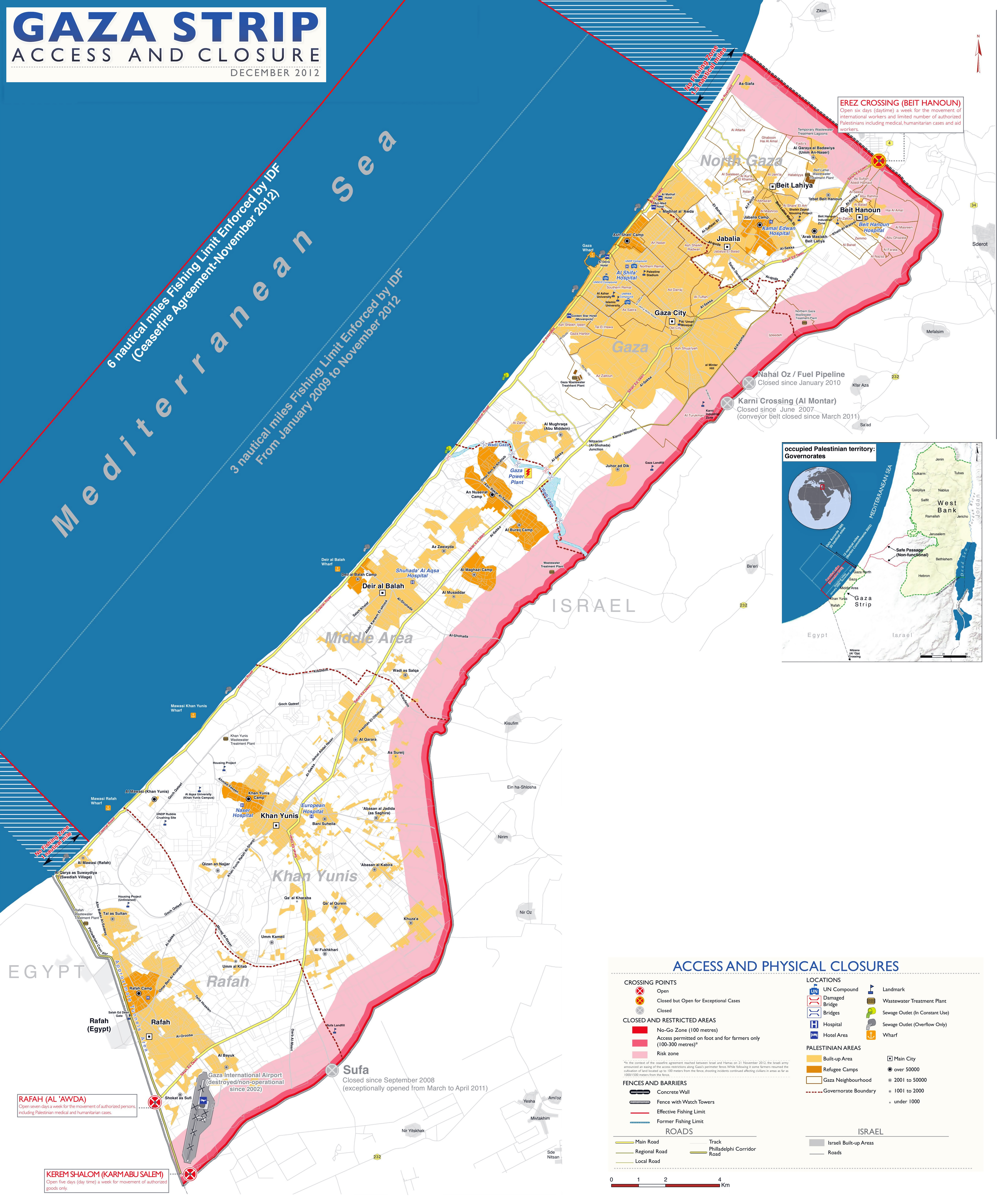
Map of Gaza showing the border proximity restrictions with Israel (as of December 2012) No-go zone 100 metres (330 ft) Access permitted by foot and by farmers only 100–300 metres (330–980 ft) At-risk zone

In 2005, Israel withdrew its forces from Gaza and allowed the Palestinian authority to take control. Despite the withdrawal, Israel still maintains direct external control over everyday life in Gaza, such as the territory's air and maritime space, most of its land crossings, electricity and water supply and other utilities. According to Human Rights Watch (HRW), Palestinians in Gaza still remain protected persons under the articles of the Geneva Conventions.

Following the 2006 Palestinian election and the subsequent Battle of Gaza in 2007, Hamas took full control over Gaza and expelled its rival and then-ruler of the West Bank, Fatah. The takeover by Hamas led Israel and Egypt to impose a land, air and sea blockade on Gaza. Gaza's economy has shriveled as a result, and many people in the territory do not have access to basic necessities. Hamas has also been accused of frequently diverting portions of the international aid Gaza receives to its wars against Israel rather than the civilian population.

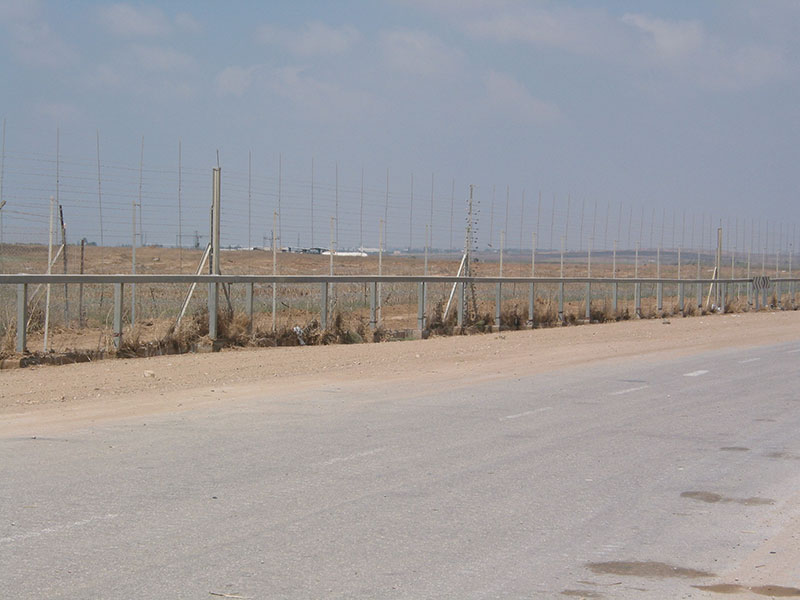
The Gaza–Israel barrier seen from the Israeli side

As a result of numerous wars between Hamas and Israel, particularly the 2014 Gaza war, the humanitarian situation in Gaza worsened. The new leadership under Yahya Sinwar hoped to get the Fatah-led Palestinian Authority to take control of Gaza's civilian affairs through the 2017 Fatah–Hamas Agreement, which was ultimately unsuccessful. According to Israeli journalist Amos Harel, Hamas, which failed to lift the blockade for years, sought to use the demonstrations as a means to get out its strategic crisis, as it found armed conflict with Israel to be ineffective.

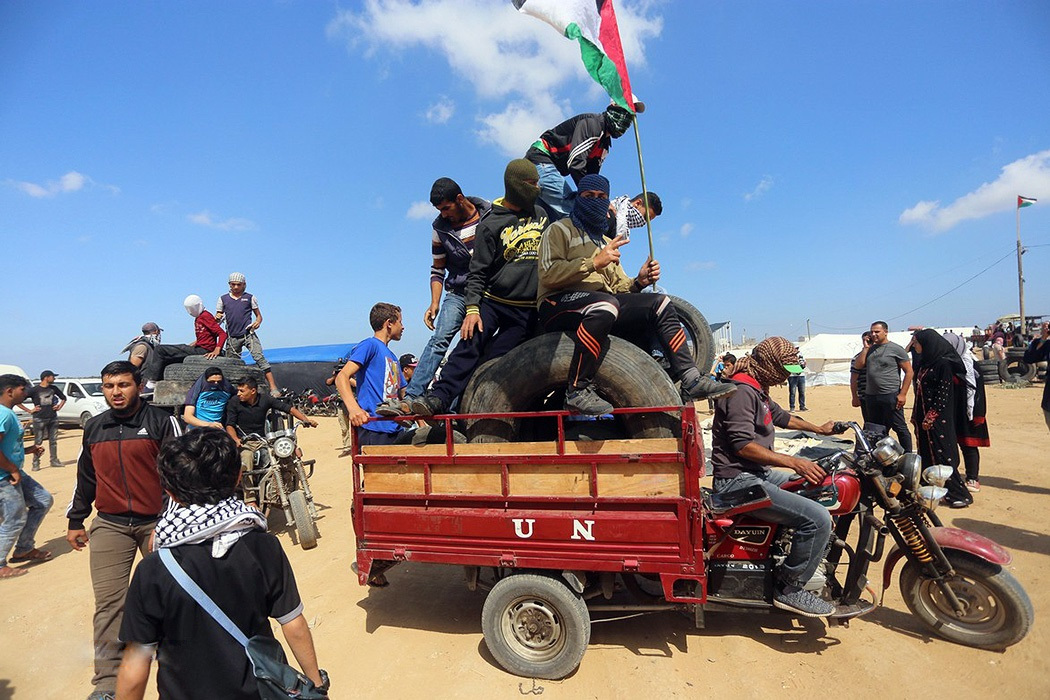
Near Gaza's border with Israel in 2018

The principal demand of the protests was the right of return for Palestinian refugees and their descendants to present-day Israel. A majority of Gaza's population consists of refugees from the 1948 Palestine War and their descendants. Israel rejects any right of return, fearing that Jews would become a minority in Israel if too many Palestinians returned.

=== Gaza's "no-go zone" and border barrier ===
In late 2005, after the Israeli disengagement from Gaza, the Israeli military imposed a "no-go zone" on the interior side of the Gaza–Israel border in response to rocket fire from Gaza falling on Israeli towns. In 2023, this zone was around 300 meters wide. According to the Israel Defense Force (IDF), this is done "to prevent the concealment of improvised explosives and to disrupt and prevent the use of the area for destructive purposes."

The border fence between Gaza and Israel (the separation barrier) is composed of a crude barbed-wire barrier, a brief gap, and then a 10 feet (3.0 m) high "smart fence" with sensors to detect infiltrators. A crowd surging towards the fence could cross the fence in some 30 seconds, according to one of the contractors who built it.

== Idea, organization, and strategy ==
The idea for a peaceful protest by Gazans demanding their right of return to Israel dates to the early 2010s. Ahmed Abu Ratima (pref. Artema), a Palestinian journalist, proposed a protest of this sort in a Facebook post. Gazan journalist Muthana al-Najjar initiated the protest in 2018 by pitching a tent near the border for over a month. It gained support from Gazan intellectuals like Atef Abu Saif and graduates of Gazan universities, who were said to have drawn inspiration from the examples of Martin Luther King Jr. and Mahatma Gandhi. The protests were eventually endorsed by most significant Palestinian political groups, including Hamas and its primary political opponent, Fatah. Other factions, such as the Palestinian Islamic Jihad, the Popular Front for the Liberation of Palestine and supporters of Muhammad Dahlan (who was expelled from Fatah in 2011) also endorsed the protests.

The organizers tried to keep the protest independent from Hamas and other political groups, but by March 2018, Hamas had become heavily involved in organizing them. Local newspapers, television and social media mobilized Gazans to join the March. Hamas also ordered its own soldiers to take part. To maximize the credibility of the protests, it reportedly planned to keep the peace by having plain clothed security personnel move among the protestors.

The protests were planned for six weeks starting on 30 March to call for the lifting of the blockade the fulfilling the right of return, having been made public in advance.

== Timeline ==
=== Prior incidents ===
There was some violence between Israel and Gaza militants in the months leading up to the protests. In February 2018, four IDF soldiers were injured by an explosive device concealed in a Palestinian flag placed on the Gazan border fence during a Palestinian protest. Israel reacted with airstrikes on Hamas military positions. Over the following days, Israel and Hamas exchanged further rocket fire, tank fire and further airstrikes. The following month, the IDF fired some ten Iron Dome missiles to intercept what the IDF sensors interpreted to be rockets, but which later turned out to be high-trajectory machine-gun fire during Hamas military exercises.

In the week prior to 30 March, the IDF arrested a suspect who crossed into Israeli territory from northern Gaza; two Palestinians were seen near the now-defunct Karni crossing container port trying to set fire to army engineering equipment close to the border fence; a group of four Palestinians infiltrated Israel near Kissufim; and 3 Gazans, armed with grenades and knives, crossed the border and were captured some 20 kilometers (12 mi) from the border, near Tze'elim.

=== 30 March 2018 ===
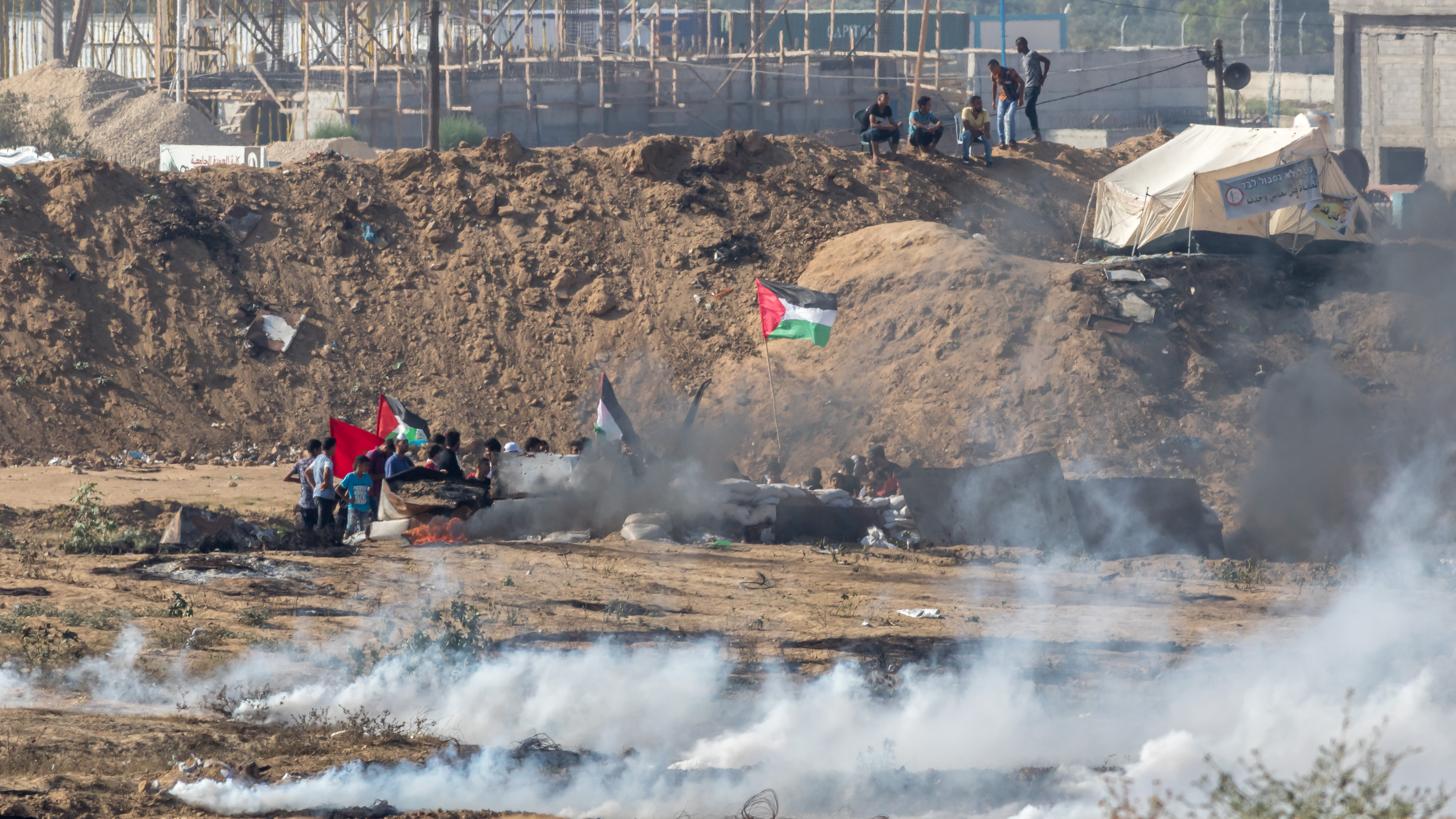
2018 Gaza border protests, Bureij refugee camp in Gaza

The first protest took place on 30 March 2018, around 500 to 700 metres (1,600 to 2,300 ft) from the Israel–Gaza border fence. The date was chosen to coincide with Land Day. 30,000 Palestinians participated. The majority of the demonstrators in the encampments were away from the border security and did not engage in violence. Hundreds of young Palestinians, however, ignored warnings by the organizers and the Israeli military to avoid the border zone. Some began throwing stones and Molotov cocktails, to which Israel responded by declaring the Gaza border zone a closed military zone and opening fire at them. The events of the day were some of the most violent in recent years. In one incident, two Palestinian gunmen approached the fence, armed with AK-47 assault rifles and hand grenades, and exchanged fire with IDF soldiers. They were killed and their bodies were recovered by the IDF.

That day, 15 Palestinians were killed by the IDF, in addition to one farmer who was allegedly killed by artillery fire in the morning prior to the protests. The IDF said a tank fired at two men who "acted suspiciously" near the border fence and did not confirm if one of them was killed. The profile of the 15 men who were killed by the IDF was a subject of debate. The IDF published an infographic with the pictures of ten of those killed, saying they were members of militant-terrorist organizations, of the seven were Hamas militants and activists, one was a "global jihad activist" and one was a member of the al-Aqsa Martyrs Brigades militant group. Some of them appear in military uniform in their pictures. Hamas, however, said that only five of its members were killed that day, and one of the men the IDF said was a Hamas operative, was a member of the al-Aqsa Martyrs Brigades, according to the organization itself. According to the IDF, among those Hamas confirmed were its members were a company commander and an operative in Hamas' tunnel warfare project. Three other Palestinians who were shot on 30 March succumbed to their wounds in the following days. One of them was a member of Palestinian Islamic Jihad. The organization said he was unarmed when he was shot.

One notable casualty, and an example of this debate, is a 19-year-old Palestinian who was seen in footage from the protest being shot in his back while holding a tire and running away from the fence. The IDF said he was a member of Hamas, a claim Hamas did not confirm and his family denied, stating he was a restaurant worker. The IDF described the footage as "edited and fabricated". His funeral did not involve the honors usually given to slain Palestinian fighters. Another 20-year-old man was shot, according to his brother, in the head, while smoking a cigarette while standing behind a group of stone throwers.

Disagreement exists also about the number of those injured that day. According to the Gaza Health Ministry, over 1,400 Palestinians suffered injuries. According to various Palestinian medical sources, around 800 were wounded with live ammunition, while the remaining were injured by rubber-coated projectiles and tear gas. The IDF, on the other hand, estimated only a few dozens were injured with live fire.

Protests continued on a lower scale throughout the week following the 30 March events. The IDF continued to fire at Palestinians along the border fence. A video was published in social media on Sunday, 2 April, showing a 19-year-old man among a group of protesters, placing a tire on another burning tire, to make it catch on fire, then waving his hands in celebration. He is then seemingly shot in the head by Israeli soldiers. Palestinian sources reported he was critically wounded.

During the week of 30 March 2018, two Palestinians were killed in two different incidents. In the first, a Palestinian member of the Democratic Front for the Liberation of Palestine (DFLP) was shot by Israeli forces after he breached the fence and entered Israel. The IDF published a video from an observation camera, showing the man hitting the fence with what seems to be a metal pipe when four other people stand behind him. He then breaches the fence and enters along with another man, which is when warning shots were probably fired. The video cuts before the man was shot and it is unclear in what circumstances was he shot and killed. In another incident, an Israeli aircraft attacked an allegedly armed Palestinian who approached the fence. The IDF published a video from an observance camera, showing the man walking slowly towards the fence, holding what appears to be an assault rifle. The army also said he was equipped with grenades and a suicide vest. The incident took place before dawn. In addition to these events, on 1 April the IDF arrested four unarmed Palestinians who entered into Israel illegally.

=== 6 April ===
Protest organizers and Hamas called for renewed demonstrations on the Gaza–Israel border the following Friday, 6 April. The IDF stated that it intended to use the same force as the preceding week to prevent infiltrations of Israeli territory.

Between 31 March and 6 April, demonstrators gathered tires in Gaza to be burnt on 6 April, in preparation for what was dubbed the "Day of the Tire" (Arabic: Jumat al-Kawshook) Israeli officials have cautioned that the mass burning of tires along the border can produce environmental harm, calling on the World Health Organization to prevent, what they termed, an "ecological catastrophe".

Thousands of Palestinians joined in 6 April demonstrations; the IDF estimated their number at 20,000 people. Palestinian medical sources reported that 9 Palestinians were killed, 1,350 were injured, and 25 were in critical condition; and that approximately 400 of those injured were hit by live ammunition. Another Palestinian who was shot that day succumbed to his wounds on 9 April.

Among those killed was Yaser Murtaja, a 30-year-old Palestinian photographer, who, according to Palestinian Health Ministry, was shot in the stomach by an Israeli sniper despite wearing a jacket emblazoned with 'press' to identify him as a journalist. According to the Palestinian Journalists' Syndicate, seven other Palestinian journalists were injured by the Israelis during that day's protest. Israeli Defense Minister, Avigdor Lieberman, said in response that "anyone who flies drones over IDF soldiers puts himself at risk." According to Israeli security sources, Murtaja was an officer in Hamas security apparatus and attempted to smuggle a drone to Gaza in 2015. Hamas, as well as Murtaja's family, denied the allegation. In addition to Murtaja, five other journalists were injured on 6 April, according to the Committee to Protect Journalists: five from live fire and one from shrapnel.

=== 8–12 April ===
On the evening of 8 April, according to the IDF, three Palestinians infiltrated the fence in northern Gaza, planted two explosive devices, and then quickly returned to Gaza. The IDF fired at the Palestinians with tank fire.

In the early morning of 9 April, the IDF said it attacked a military compound belonging to Hamas in northern Gaza in response to the attempted infiltration with explosives. The IDF said Hamas "is solely responsible for what is happening in Gaza from above and below the ground".

On the morning of 11 April, Palestinians set off a bomb near an Israeli construction vehicle adjacent to the Gaza fence. The IDF fired tank shells at positions that it said belonged to Hamas.

On 12 April, Israeli aircraft attacked Hamas targets in northern Gaza in retaliation for the previous days' bomb attack close to the border fence. Hamas fighters east of Shuja'iyya targeted the aircraft with machine gun fire, and several of the bullets fell on a home in Israel. An Israeli airstrike targeted them, killing one Hamas fighter and wounding another. The Hamas fighter who was killed was identified as Mohammed Hamada Hijila. It was subsequently reported that he had taken part in an infamous raid on an Israeli border post in which five Israeli soldiers had been killed during the 2014 Israel-Gaza conflict.

=== 13 April ===
Protests on a third consecutive Friday were smaller than prior weeks. The IDF estimated that 10,000 people protested on 13 April. Palestinians attempted to breach the border fence, hurled molotov cocktails and explosive devices, and attempted to fly firebomb kites into Israeli territory.

During the protests, the IDF killed three Palestinians:

- Islam Hirzallah, who was hit by live ammunition to the abdomen.
- Tahrir Mahmoud Wahba, who is deaf, was fatally wounded, and died on 23 April.
- Ahmed Abu Hussein, a photojournalist wearing a protective vest marked 'press,' was also fatally wounded and died in Sheba Hospital in Tel HaShomer on 25 April, after being transferred for treatment.

The Gaza Ministry of Health reported that 969 people were injured by Israeli forces, among them were 67 children, and 223 people hit by live ammunition. Fifteen of the people sustaining live-fire injuries were in critical condition late on 13 April.

=== 14–16 April ===
On 14 April, four Palestinians were killed in a blast near one of the protest camps, the Islamic Jihad Movement in Palestine said that they were members of the organization and that they died during "preparations".

Several kites with firebombs attached were flown by Palestinians into Israeli territory, sparking several fires, with at least 3 fire bomb kites located on 14 April. No injuries were caused.

On 15 April, the IDF said it destroyed a tunnel that crossed the Gaza-Israel border.

On 16 April, additional fire bomb kites were flown from Gaza. One kite started a fire that burned a wheat field on the Israeli side of the border.

=== 20 April ===
Protests on Friday, 20 April, have been labeled the "Women's March of Gaza" and were intended to highlight the active role women are playing in the protest. The IDF estimates that 10,000 people participated in protests. At least four Palestinians were killed on 20 April, among them a 15-year-old boy, and over four dozen were injured by Israeli soldiers. Another Palestinian later died of wounds sustained that day. Before the expected protests, the IDF dropped leaflets over Gaza warning anyone against approaching the fence or attempting to damage it.

Five Palestinians were fatally shot on by Israeli live fire on 20 April.

- Mohammad Ayoub of Al Falouja neighborhood in Jabalia refugee camp, was fatally shot in the head. His brother and cousin, who were eyewitnesses to his shooting, stated that Ayoub was sitting on the ground, then ran to escape the effects of tear gas, at which time he was shot. Ayoub was the fourth Palestinian child to be killed during the protests.
- Ahmed Abu Aqel, 25, of Jabalia. Abu Aqel was shot a previous demonstration over US recognition of Jerusalem as the capital of Israel in December 2017. He walks on crutches due to the injury and was on a sand dune 150 meters from the fence at the time of his shooting, according to the non-profit organisation Al Mezan Center for Human Rights in Gaza. Israeli forces fatally shot him to the back of the head.
- Ahmed Al Athamna, 24, of Beit Hanoun, was fatally shot by bullet to the upper back, according to Al Mezan.
- Sa'ad Abu Taha was fatally shot in the neck in eastern Khan Younis. He was approximately 100 meters from the border, according to Al Mezan.
- Abdullah Shamali was injured by a bullet to his abdomen east of Rafah, and died on the night of 22–23 April.

The Gaza Health Ministry reported that 445 people were injured in protests, including 96 who were shot with live ammunition. 174 people were hospitalized while the remainder were treated at clinic tents at the protest sites.

=== 27 April ===
According to Israeli military estimates, over 10,000 people gathered to join the day's protest, themed the "Day of Rebellious Youth."

For the first time in the five-week campaign, protesters reached the electrified border fence, having passed a smaller barbed wire barrier; Israeli soldiers fired shots and threw a hand grenade at a group of twelve men climbing the fence, hitting several in the head. A large crowd (the IDF reported "several hundred"; The New York Times, "thousands") of people rushed toward the Karni border crossing, after a speech by Hamas leader Ismail Radwan. The IDF launched tear gas and opened fire with live ammunition at the crowd, injuring several people. Israeli military sources state that at least two armed Palestinians, among the large crowd, approached the border and fired at least seven rounds at Israeli soldiers. According to The New York Times, retaliatory Israeli fire, which included a hand grenade, wounded two unarmed protesters.

The Gaza Ministry of Health initially reported that three Palestinians were killed, all of them by bullets to the head. Two more Palestinians later died of wounds suffered on 27 April. Overall, Palestinian reports stated that 884 protesters had been wounded, some 174 by live Israeli fire. Four medical staff and six journalists were among those wounded. Azzam Oweida was shot in the head and died on 28 April Anas Abu Asr was fatally wounded near Gaza City and died on 3 May.

On the night of 27 April, the Israeli Air Force attacked six targets in the Port of Gaza belonging to Hamas naval commando forces, injuring four people. The Israeli army said it was responding to "terror acts and the major attempt to infiltrate the border into Israeli territory earlier in the day."

=== 29 April ===
Three separate incidents along the fence occurred during the evening of 29 April between the IDF and Palestinians. In the first incident, the IDF said that two men "attempted to infiltrate" Israel from southern Gaza, one was killed and the other captured after being wounded. In the second incident, the IDF said that two men who had crossed the fence "hurled explosive devices" at IDF soldiers before they shot and killed them. In a third incident, two Palestinians with breaching tools and knives were arrested while attempting to breach the fence.

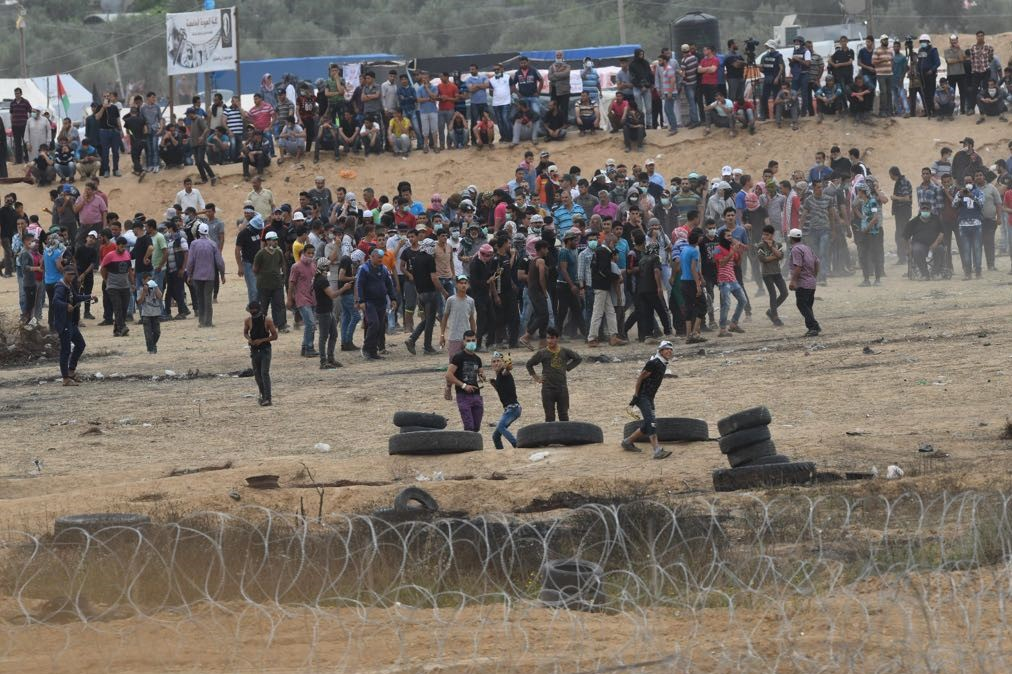
Protesters throwing rocks at IDF soldiers at Gaza border

=== 2–7 May ===
A firebomb kite launched from Gaza caused a large fire in the Be'eri Forest, burning hundreds of dunams of woodland. Ten firefighter teams toiled to extinguish and contain the forest fire.

Protesters organized for 4 May as the "Friday of the Palestinian Worker," in honor of International Workers' Day earlier in the week. Israeli officials estimated that 10,000 people participated in the protests. Shortly after noon, confrontations began between protesters, who threw stones, burned tires, and launched flammable kites, and Israeli soldiers, who fired tear gas and live ammunition.

By evening, medical officials estimated that 1,100 protesters were injured, including 82 shot with live ammunition, and 800 suffering from the effects of tear gas. Two off-the-shelf drones used by IDF were shot down by Palestinian slingshots. Protesters entered and damaged property used by Israeli forces at Kerem Shalom border crossing; Israeli officials said the property was on the Palestinian side of the border. The damage included burning a pipeline that Israel uses to supply fuel to Gaza.

Palestinians had prepared hundreds of firebomb kites, intending to fly them as swarms into Israel exploiting the heavy heat wave to ignite fires, however since the wind was blowing in the wrong direction to the west. The wind also blew tear gas and smoke from burning tires westwards into the Palestinian crowd chasing many away.

On 5 May, six Hamas operatives were killed in an explosion in Deir al-Balah. A statement by Hamas' military wing blamed Israel – stating that it was a "heinous crime that has been committed against [its] fighters". The IDF spokesperson stated that "the IDF is not involved in this incident in any way". A Palestinian, a source for Haaretz, said that it was "an explosion resulting from the handling of explosives inside a building".

The IDF struck a Hamas outpost in northern Gaza which was used to launch burning objects at Israeli territory. Maj Avichai Adraee tweeted "Attack kites are not a kids' game and we don't see it that way. Hamas is using you [Gazans] and is pushing you toward the circle of terrorism," while Shai Hajaj, head of Merhavim Regional Council in southern Israel, said "When the courts in Jerusalem are discussing petitions from left-wing organizations to tie the hands of the soldiers standing in front of the Gaza protesters who want to break through the fence, the arson continues in the field of farmers... We demand that the IDF stop this [Palestinian] violence immediately".

On 6 May, three Palestinians were killed at the southern end of the Gaza border fence. According to the IDF, they were carrying petrol bombs, an ax, wire cutters, an oxygen mask and gloves.

On 7 May, Incendiary balloons launched from Gaza set fire to a wheat field near Mefalsim and to the Be'eri Forest. Similar to the firebomb kites, the incendiary balloon lofted an already-lit Molotov cocktail. The normally prevailing westerly winds propel the balloons to Israel, and the burning Molotov cocktail causes the balloons to explode in midair, with burning material falling to the ground below.

It was reported by Haaretz that Hamas found itself in an "unprecedented" crisis and "dire" situation, and attempting to enter negotiations with Israel about establishing a long-term truce in order to ease the siege of the enclave, and lower tensions, without, as far as it is known, obtaining any clear response from Israel. The Israeli reluctance might, according to defense correspondent Amos Harel, lead to an explosion of rage on the forthcoming occasion of Nakba Day.

=== 11–13 May ===
15,000 demonstrators took part in Friday protests on 11 May. Some of them burned tires, in the hope the smoke would provide cover for saboteurs to destroy and cross the border fence, and threw grenades, pipe bombs and stones at Israeli troops. A 40-year-old Palestinian was killed and 973 were injured, seven of them critically. The IDF used new, small remote-controlled aircraft with knives on their wings to counter incendiary kites launched from Gaza, downing more than 40 kites.

Palestinians broke into the Kerem Shalom border crossing, the main conduit of goods in and of Gaza, setting a gas pipeline alight, damaging a fuel pipe, and torching a conveyor belt. The Israeli air force destroyed an underground attack tunnel that reached just a few meters away from the border.

On 12 May, Israel announced that the Kerem Shalom border crossing "will remain closed until the damage caused by the riots are repaired and will reopen in accordance with a situation assessment," opening only for humanitarian cases until such a decision is made.

On 13 May, Israeli soldiers fired at Palestinians approaching within 75 feet (23 m) of the fence. Alaa Asawafiri, a 26-year-old woman who was part of a group of women shouting towards the fence, was shot in the stomach and hospitalised in critical condition.

=== 14 May ===
Protests and violence on 14 May coincided with the ceremony marking the relocation of the U.S. embassy to Jerusalem, which international media regarded as the reason for increased tensions. Both events were timed to mark 70 years since the foundation of Israel.

During the protests, the IDF used live fire, leading to 52 Gazan fatalities and injuring more than 1200 (according to Gaza health officials), making it "the bloodiest day in Gaza since the end of the 2014 war." By the end of the day, at least 60 Palestinians were reported to have been killed, when Hamas claim 50 of them as its militants, and Islamic Jihad claimed 3 members of its military wing. Palestinian sources said that about 2700 were injured. Some of those who were killed or injured included health care workers providing medical care to the protesters. One of the wounded subsequently died on 13 August. One Israeli sniper later stated that on this day he and his locator broke the standing record for knee-shots that day, managing to make 42 hits.

The IDF reported that during the day, a Hamas squad attempted to breach the border fence with Israel and opened fire on Israeli forces. All eight attackers were killed by Israeli troops in the exchange of gunfire. The IDF released video of the incident.

The IDF said three of those killed had attempted to plant explosives at the border fence, and that in two incidents Israeli troops opened fire after they were shot at. The Israeli Air Force attacked five Hamas targets in a Jabalia training camp in response to the attempt at planting explosives and shooting at IDF troops. Israel said that "Most of the people killed belonged to the Hamas terror group, and some to the Palestinian Islamic Jihad" and that "at least 24" of the people killed were later identified as known members of terrorist organizations . One Israeli soldier was lightly wounded by what was believed to be a stone thrown by a Palestinian. Likud's Avi Dichter reassured the Knesset that he was not concerned about any possible breach of the border fence since "the IDF has enough bullets for everyone."

Hamas political bureau member Salah al-Bardawi said that 50 of the 62 killed in the protests from 14 to 15 May were Hamas members – adding that these were "official numbers", though he did not specify whether they were members of Hamas' armed or political wing. Speaking to CNN, a Hamas spokesman, Abdel Latif Quanau, said he could not confirm or deny these numbers, and that "The protests are peaceful and include all political and military factions." Amira Hass, an Israeli journalist for Haaretz, received al-Bardawi's statement with skepticism saying that one her friends in Gaza told her that "this [figure of 50] is another typical exaggeration of ours". Islamic Jihad said three members of its Saraya al-Quds military wing were among those killed. An Islamic Jihad official said those killed were unarmed and participating in a legitimate protest.

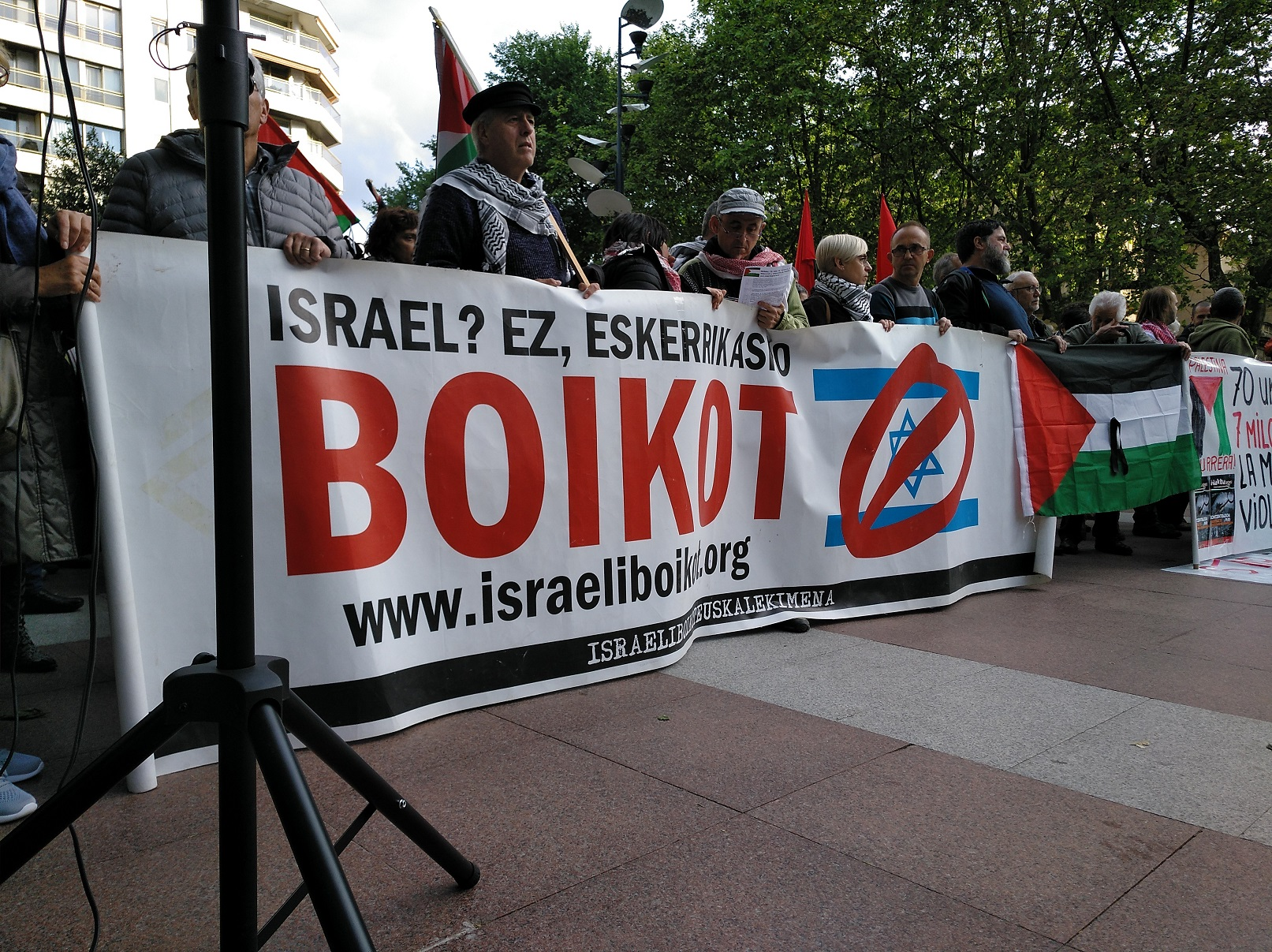
Protest in San Sebastián, Spain, 15 May 2018 showing an Israel flag crossed out.

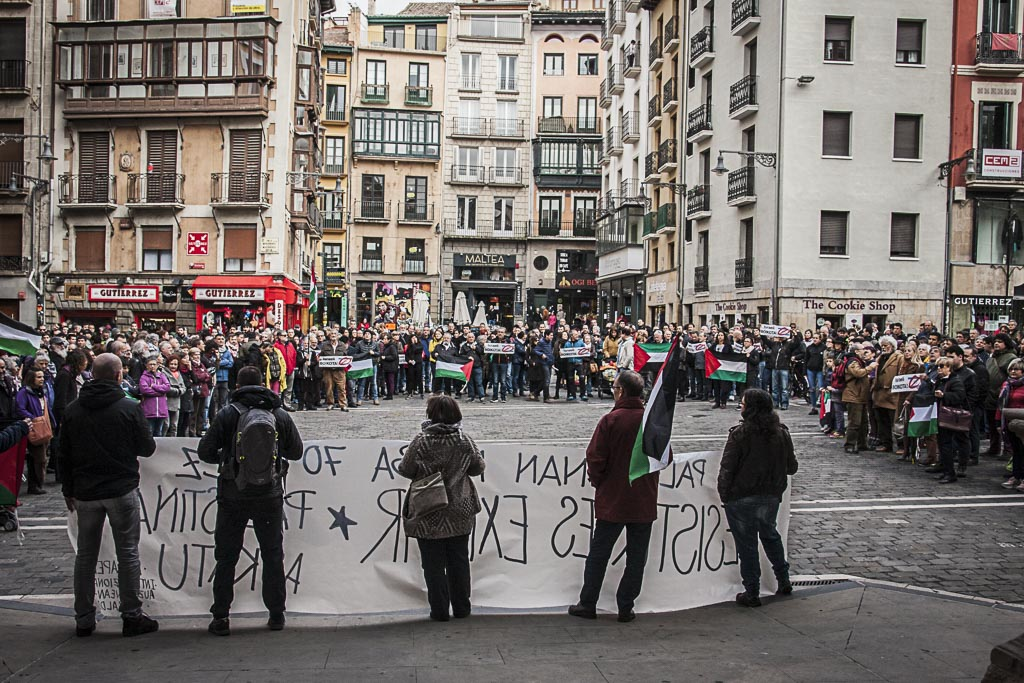
Solidarity with Gaza Palestinians in Pamplona, 15 May 2018

A spokesperson for the United Nations Human Rights Commission, Rupert Colville, called the killings an "outrageous human rights violation" by Israel. Zeid Ra'ad al-Hussein, the United Nations High Commissioner for Human Rights, said "those responsible for outrageous human rights violations must be held to account". Numerous countries expressed concern with the killings, including Russia, France, Germany, and the UK. Germany, the UK, Ireland, and Belgium called for an independent inquiry. The United States said the deaths were tragic and placed responsibility on Hamas, stating that Israel has the right to defend its borders. South Africa withdrew its ambassador to Israel, citing "the indiscriminate and grave manner of the latest Israeli attack". Turkey's president Recep Tayyip Erdoğan, addressing Turkish students in London in a speech broadcast by Turkey's state television, said that Turkey would recall its ambassadors from Israel and the U.S., and said that Israel's action against Palestinian protesters was "genocide".

This statement started a diplomatic row between Turkish and Israeli leaders, causing the Knesset to propose that Israel officially recognize the killing of over a million Armenians by Ottoman Turkey in the early 20th century as an act of genocide, which modern-day Turkey has never acknowledged.

=== 15–16 May ===
Protest organizers declared a day of mourning for those killed on the prior day. Fewer people attended protests at the border. One protester was killed, according to the Gaza Health Ministry.

On 16 May, Several houses in the Israeli city of Sderot were hit by machine gun fire from Gaza, causing damage but no injuries. Israel said Hamas curbed Gaza protests after pressure from Egypt.

=== 22 May ===
A group of Palestinians crossed the border fence on 22 May and set fire to an abandoned IDF post near Bureij. Following the incident, IDF tanks fired at a Hamas post in the area of the incident.

=== 25 May ===
Some 1,600 Gazans attended the weekly Friday protests in two locations on 25 May. In one of the locations, dozens of youth reached less than 300 meters from the fence and burnt tires. East of the Gaza city reached the fence and tried to open it. The IDF Spokesperson's unit reported Palestinians threw an improvised explosive device towards soldiers. The IDF responded to the events with crowd-control means and live ammunition, hurting at least 109 Palestinians, ten of whom from live ammunition, according to medical sources in Gaza. Firebomb kites were also flown by the Palestinians towards Israel and were shot down by Israeli soldiers. Ismail Haniyeh and Yahya Sinwar visited one of the protest camps.

=== 1 June ===
The Gaza Ministry of Health stated that 100 protesters were injured, 40 with live ammunition, and that among the casualties, Razan Ashraf al-Najjar, a young female paramedic dressed in medical staff uniform was shot dead by snipers who had opened fire on a group of five paramedics as they moved to assist wounded demonstrators near the fence. Numerous protests continued, Israeli firefighters were called in to douse fires on their side of the border, tires were burned, some attempts were made to damage the border fence, military vehicles were fired on and one infiltrator entered Israel, set off a grenade, and returned to Gaza.

=== 22 June ===
On the afternoon on 22 June, an estimated 7,000 participants protested at the border. By evening 200 people had suffered injuries, including 8 minors.

=== 29 June ===
On 29 June, Yasser Abu al-Najja died of wounds to the head near eastern Khan Younis, while Muhammad Fawzi Muhammad al-Hamaydeh died of wounds to his stomach and legs east of Rafah. According to the Gaza Ministry of Health, further 415 suffered injuries, from gunfire or tear-gas inhalation, with three in a critical condition.

=== 6–15 July (March of Return) ===
3,000 Gazans took part in the regular Friday protest. 396 were injured, 57 by live fire. Zahadia Haniyeh, a niece of Hamas leader, Ismael Haniyeh, was reportedly shot in the stomach, while Mohammed Abu Halima was shot dead with a bullet wound to the chest.

On 13 July two Palestinian children, Othman Rami Halas and Muhammad Nasser Sharab, were killed by Israeli live fire, the former near eastern Gaza City, the latter near in eastern Khan Younis. During the day's demonstrations, a further 68 to 200 Gazans were reportedly injured.

An IDF officer was wounded by a hand grenade thrown by Palestinian assailants during clashes at the border fence.

On 14 July, two Palestinians were killed in an Israeli airstrike and four Israelis were wounded by mortar fire from Gaza in what the New York Times described as "the most severe exchange of fire between Israel and Palestinian militants in the Gaza Strip since the 2014 war." According to an IDF spokesman, "Saturday's operation aimed to stop arson attacks, attempted border breaches, and assaults on soldiers from Gaza that have grown increasingly violent." Hamas and allied Islamic militant groups fired 100 to 174 projectiles from Gaza into Israel, one mortar struck a synagogue in Sderot.

=== 16 July ===
Israeli news media outlets announced that, in response to firebomb kites flown by Gaza militants, the Israeli government would temporarily suspend deliveries of gas and petrol through the Kerem Shalom border crossing into Gaza, and will also limit offshore fishing to half the previous maritime limit.

Palestinians outfitted a falcon with a harness with a flammable material strung at the end of a steel wire and sent the bird across the border, attempting to start a fire in Israel.

=== 20 July ===
Four Palestinians were killed and an estimated 120 Gazans were injured, including a 14 year old with a bullet shot to the head.

==== Fire exchange ====
On 20 July, an Israeli soldier was killed near the Gaza border, allegedly, by a Palestinian sniper. In response, the Israeli army retaliated with air attacks and tank fire aimed at eight military Hamas posts east of Khan Yunis and near the southern Rafah. Four Hamas military wing members were killed in the exchange of fire. Following the strikes, three rockets were fired into Israeli communities around Gaza. Two projectiles were intercepted by the Iron Dome and another fell in an open field. United Nations Special Coordinator for the Middle East Peace Process Nickolay Mladenov tweeted "everyone in Gaza needs to step back from the brink. Not next week. Not tomorrow. Right NOW! Those who want to provoke Palestinians and Israelis into another war must not succeed." According to Hamas, there was a ceasefire agreed upon afterwards, but Israel did not comment.

=== 21 July ===
Several Palestinians crossed the border fence into Israel, then returned to Gaza's territory. An IDF tank fired at a Hamas post in northern Gaza in response.

=== 27 July ===
Two Palestinians, Majdi Ramzi Kamal al-Satri and Ghazi Muhammad Abu Mustafa were shot dead with bullets to the head, east of Rafah and east of Khan Younis respectively. A further 246 were reportedly injured. Three paramedics among the injured sustained moderate wounds, at eastern Jabaliya.

=== 3 August ===
Eight Palestinians were reportedly shot, east of Khan Younis in 19 March, which was conducted under the slogan of "Martyr of Jerusalem, Muhammad Youssef," a 17 year old killed earlier.

=== 7–8 August ===
Israel killed two Hamas members in Gaza on 7 August. Hamas said that the two men were snipers taking part in a live-fire exercise in Gazan territory. Israel stated that the gunmen fired on its soldiers and an Israeli tank shelled them in response.

Gaza militants fired rockets into Israel and the Israeli military responded with air strikes on 8 August. The Washington Post reported than 180 rockets and other rounds of munition were fired into Israel with the Israeli air force firing at about 150 targets in Gaza. A pregnant Palestinian woman and her daughter, a toddler, were killed.

=== 10 August ===
Abdullah Al-Qatati, a Palestinian medic, died after being shot in the head by a sniper. Ahmad Jamal Abu Luli died after being shot in the pelvis. Ali Said al-Aloul was the third fatality in the shootings. 307 Palestinians were reportedly injured, 70, including 28 children, five paramedics and two journalists, were wounded by live fire, five critically. One attempt was made to cross the border, and a grenade was reportedly thrown.

=== 17 August ===
241 Palestinians were reportedly wounded, some 40 by live fire. 18 minors were among those injured. Two Palestinians were shot dead one identified as Karim Abu Fatayir east of al-Bureij refugee camp and the other identified as Saadi Akram Muammar east of Rafah.

=== 24 August ===
189 Palestinians were reportedly injured, 50 by live ammunition, and the others by rubber-coated steel bullets or tear-gas inhalation. 73 were hospitalized.

=== 12 October ===
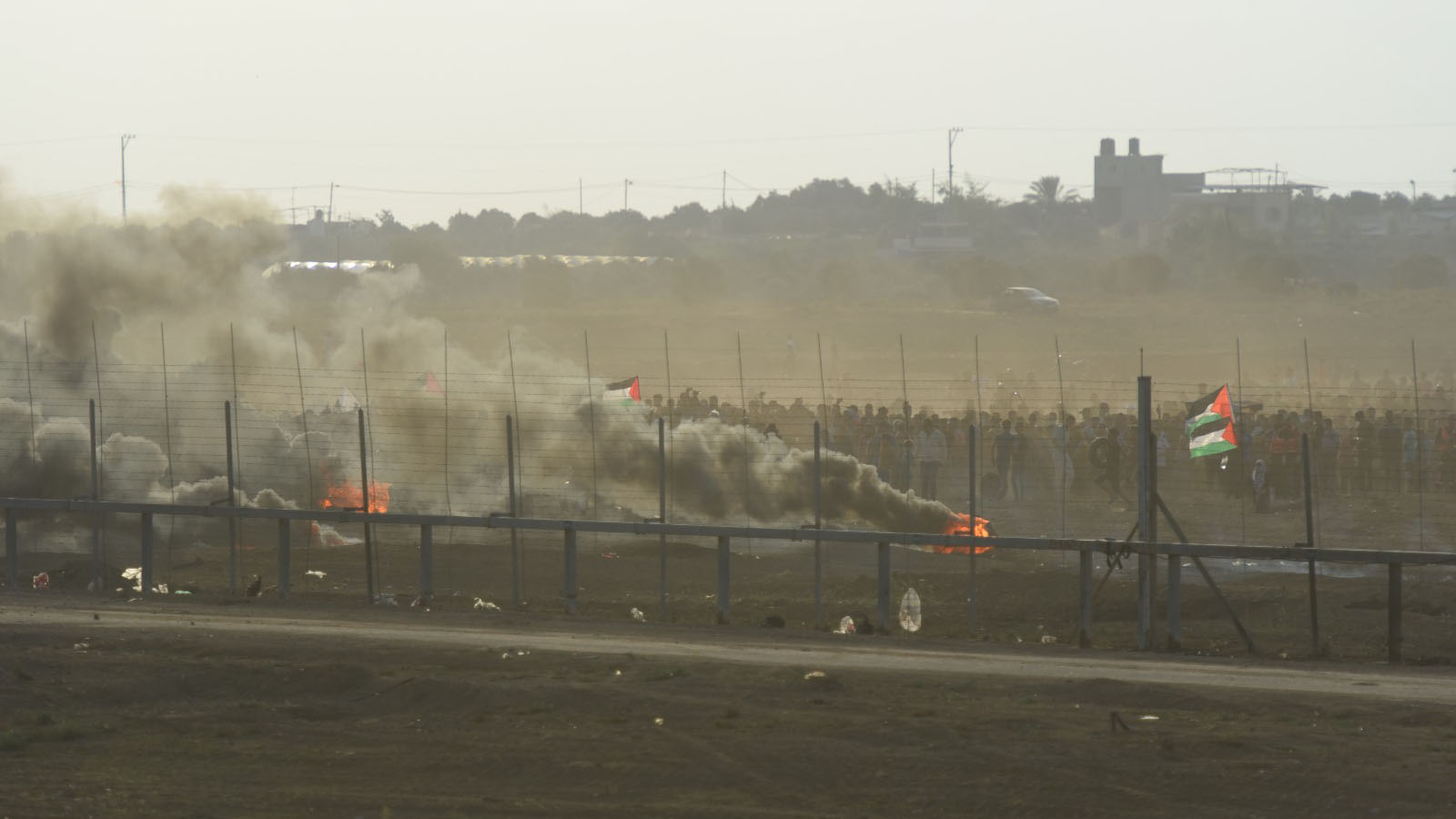
View from the Israeli side of the border on 5 October

Seven Palestinians were killed in violent protests along the border fence. Four Palestinians were shot dead after they crossed into Israeli territory and approached a sniper's post.

== Casualties ==
Fatalities and injuries between 30 March and 31 December 2018
| | Gaza | Israel |
|---|---|---|
| Live ammunition fatalities | 183 | 0 |
| Live ammunition injuries | 6106 | 0 |
| Shrapnel injuries | 1576 | 1 |
| Rubber-coated bullet injuries | 438 | 0 |
| Tear-gas canister injuries | 1084 | 0 |
| Stone/explosive injuries | 0 | 4 |

One Israeli soldier was injured due to shrapnel from a grenade thrown by a Palestinian from inside Gaza and one Israeli soldier was killed by Palestinian sniper fire near the fence but outside of the context of the protests.

The head of the World Health Organization (WHO)'s office in Gaza, Gerald Rockenschaub, described the casualties as overwhelming an already weak health care system: "the deteriorating humanitarian situation is extremely worrying. Hospitals in Gaza are overwhelmed with the influx of injured patients. With further escalations expected during the coming weeks, the increasing numbers of injured patients requiring urgent medical care is likely to devastate Gaza's already weakened health system, placing even more lives at risk." According to the Ministry of Health in Gaza, 69 ambulances were damaged.

Doctors Without Borders released a statement on 14 May 2018 calling the Israeli response "inhuman and unacceptable" saying that the hospitals in Gaza were overwhelmed and in a chaotic situation comparable to the 2014 Israel-Gaza conflict. It stated that "most of the wounded will be condemned to suffer lifelong injuries".

Human Rights Watch (HRW) observers stated, with regard to 30 March, "while some protesters near the border fence burned tires and threw rocks, [HRW] could find no evidence of any protester using firearms or any IDF claim of threatened firearm use at the demonstrations." The organization said there is evidence of Palestinians who did not pose any threat to Israeli guards being shot. B'Tselem said that "shooting unarmed demonstrators is illegal and the command that allows it is manifestly illegal."

On 29 April 2018, with the death toll at 44, an Israeli officer claimed that most of the deaths were unintentional, and that the snipers aimed for protesters' legs but sometimes missed, the bullets ricocheted, or the protesters suddenly bent over.

=== Characterization of the injuries caused by Israeli fire ===
The Commissioner General of the United Nations Relief and Works Agency for Palestine Refugees in the Near East (UNRWA) stated that the ammunition used by Israel caused severe internal damage to internal organs, muscle tissue and bones. A Palestinian doctor interviewed by CNN stated that about a half of the wounded people would never walk normally again. The head of plastic and reconstructive surgery at Al-Shifa Hospital in Gaza wrote a letter to The British Medical Journal stating that "from the appearance of the wounds there appears to have been systematic use by [IDF] snipers of ammunition with an expanding 'butterfly' effect.", and stated that since the surgical procedures and rehabilitation facilities are not available in Gaza due to 2014 conflict and the blockade of Gaza, "mass lifelong disability is now the prospect facing Gazan citizens, largely young." The Israeli military stated that they only used normal sniper ammunition, and fired at the feet and legs to minimize civilian casualties.

According to Amnesty International, who interviewed military experts and a forensic pathologist, "many of the wounds observed by doctors in Gaza are consistent with those caused by high-velocity Israeli-manufactured Tavor rifles using 5.56mm military ammunition. Other wounds bear the hallmarks of US-manufactured M24 Remington sniper rifles shooting 7.62mm hunting ammunition, which expand and mushroom inside the body. The nature of these injuries shows that Israeli soldiers are using high-velocity military weapons designed to cause maximum harm to Palestinian protesters who do not pose an imminent threat to them."

=== Killing of medical personnel ===
There have been several accusations of Israel attacking medical personnel. On 18 April, the Palestinian human rights organization Al-Haq accused Israel of shooting at civilians who were providing medical assistance to the wounded.

The Gaza-based human rights organization Al Mezan stated on 25 April that Israel had shot two paramedics working with the Palestinian Red Crescent Society. It also stated that the situation has been compounded by Israel's refusal to allow personal safety equipment into Gaza, including respirators.

A Canadian doctor, Tarek Loubani, was one of 19 medical personnel shot on 14 May. He stated that he was clearly marked, and believed that he was targeted by the Israeli military. One of the paramedics who treated Loubani was killed later on the same day. Canada's Prime Minister Justin Trudeau said he was "appalled" at the shooting of Loubani and called for "an immediate independent investigation to thoroughly examine the facts on the ground – including any incitement, violence, and the excessive use of force".

In June 2018, Palestinian nurse Rouzan al-Najjar was fatally shot in the chest as she, reportedly with her arms raised to show she was unarmed, tried to help evacuate the wounded near Israel's border fence with Gaza.

=== Other notable casualties ===
An eight-month-old child, Leila al-Ghandour was widely reported, following an initial statement by the Gaza Health ministry, to have been a victim of tear-gas at the border. The following day, the Gaza Health Ministry announced that it was not certain of the cause of death and two weeks later struck her name off the official list of people killed during the protests. In a court case against a Fatah al-Aqsa Martyrs' Brigades militant, who had been captured on the border, the indictment stated that man in question was a relative of the deceased's parents, and had stated the latter had been paid by Yahya Sinwar, the head of Izz ad-Din al-Qassam Brigades in Gaza, about US$2,200 to report to the media that she had died of tear gas inhalation rather than from a pre-existing medical condition.

Several members of the Gaza Sunbirds, a para-cycling team based in Gaza, had their legs amputated after being injured at the Great March of Return.

=== Prevalence of militants among the killed ===
Israeli defense sources claimed that a large fraction of those killed were members or otherwise affiliated with Palestinian militant organizations. According to Israel, the demonstrations provided cover for attacks by militants.

On 11 April, the military-affiliated Israeli Intelligence and Terrorism Information Center (ITIC) published a report in which it stated that 26 of the 32 persons killed belonged to or were affiliated with Palestinian militant groups. The report identified thirteen of these as belonging to the military wings of these organizations, and six as members of the Gaza security forces.

On 14 May, when 59 to 62 Palestinians were killed, Hamas claimed 50 of them and Palestinian Islamic Jihad claimed three as members of its military wing.

On 8 June, ITIC stated that it had identified 124 of the 127 Gazans reportedly killed in demonstrations since March. It reported that 102 of the killed were affiliated with either the militant or civilian wings of Fatah, Hamas, PIJ, the DFLP, or the PFLP.

== Legal cases ==
Two Palestinians, Yousef Karnaz and Mohammad Al-Ajouri, each had to have one of their legs amputated after Israeli authorities denied their requests to receive medical treatment at a better-equipped hospital in the West Bank. Israeli authorities issued a statement claiming that "The main consideration for the refusal stems from the fact that their medical condition is a function of their participation in the disturbances." The Israeli Arab minority rights organization Adalah and Al Mezan petitioned the Israeli Supreme Court to grant an emergency hearing to consider the request on 12 April, but as the Court decided to give the Israeli government three days to respond and due to this delay, doctors were forced to amputate their legs.

On 15 April, four Israeli human rights organizations, Yesh Din, Gisha, HaMoked, and the Association for Civil Rights in Israel jointly petitioned the Israeli Supreme Court to revoke the rules of engagement used by the IDF in response to the protests. They argued that "there is no prohibition on demonstrating in Gaza and that if incidents of violence or attempts to cross the fence occur during demonstrations, they alone constitute civil disturbances of the peace. In such disturbances, the law permits live fire only in cases of immediate mortal danger." In response, the Israeli government refused to disclose its rules of engagement publicly, but said they "comply with Israeli law and with international law." The government indicated that it views the protests as "part of the armed conflict between the Hamas terror organization and Israel, with all that this implies." On 24 May 2018, the Supreme Court rejected the petition, ruling that the protests were not unarmed protests but a part of an armed conflict which were used as a cover to carry out terror attacks against Israel and risk Israeli lives.

On 16 April, the Supreme Court ruled that Karnaz must be allowed to exit Gaza to receive medical treatment in the West Bank to save his remaining leg.

== Investigations ==
On 5 April 2018, the IDF announced that its Southern Command would conduct an internal investigation into the deaths of civilians during the prior week. Brigadier General Moti Baruch was appointed to lead a second government investigation. Press reports indicate that Baruch's investigation will focus on incidents which appear to have a cause for inquiry.

On 18 March 2019, a three-person United Nations commission urged Israeli authorities to "step up" their investigations into Israeli troops shootings of Palestinian demonstrators during the protests. The U.N. investigators believe that the shootings "may have constituted war crimes and crimes against humanity." The commission of inquiry presented the United Nations Human Rights Council a full 250-page report.

== Tactics ==
=== Palestinian tactics ===
Observers from the International Crisis Group and the UN Office for the Coordination of Humanitarian Affairs reported that the majority of protesters acted nonviolently on 30 March and 6 April.

On both of the larger protest days, hundreds of primarily young men approached or entered the 300-metre "exclusion zone" declared by Israeli military forces, thrown stones, hurled Molotov cocktails, and attempted to plant Palestinian flags. A New York Times account described the purpose of approaching the fence as "a powerful statement of defiance, bravery and national pride" among Palestinians.

The Israeli military accused Hamas of using the protests as a guise to launch attacks against Israel, and warned about further reprisals. IDF spokesperson Ronen Manelis said that Hamas was forcing bus companies to transport people to the border for 6 April protests.

Israeli politicians repeated their accusations that Hamas utilizes protesters as human shields. The United States' Special Representative for International Negotiations Jason Greenblatt stated, with regards to the planned 6 April protest, that "[they] condemn leaders and protestors who call for violence or who send protestors – including children – to the fence, knowing that they may be injured or killed".

==== Tent encampment ====
Organizers set up five tents 500 to 700 metres (1,600 to 2,300 ft) from the border and during the campaign their number grew to several dozen. Each tent was labeled with the town or village from which its occupants were expelled. In the encampment, protesters slept, ate, lived on the site which also hosted religious gatherings and weddings. Protests near the camps were large, diverse in participation, and peaceful. Many engaged in sit-in protests organized around their tents.

Earthen embankments were erected near the 300 m (980 ft) mark to try to shield those further away from Israeli sniper fire.

==== Tire burning ====
Palestinians frequently burned tires and t-shirts which produced thick smoke and obstructed the sightlines of Israeli snipers. To this end, thousands of old tires were collected from around Gaza and transported to the border. Often young men would roll burning tires towards the fence to set it on fire and to create smokescreens.

==== Mask usage ====
Palestinian protesters wore masks to protect themselves both from tear gas inhalation and to obscure their faces as it was speculated that the Israeli military was identifying and targeting known militants.

==== Incendiary kites and balloons ====
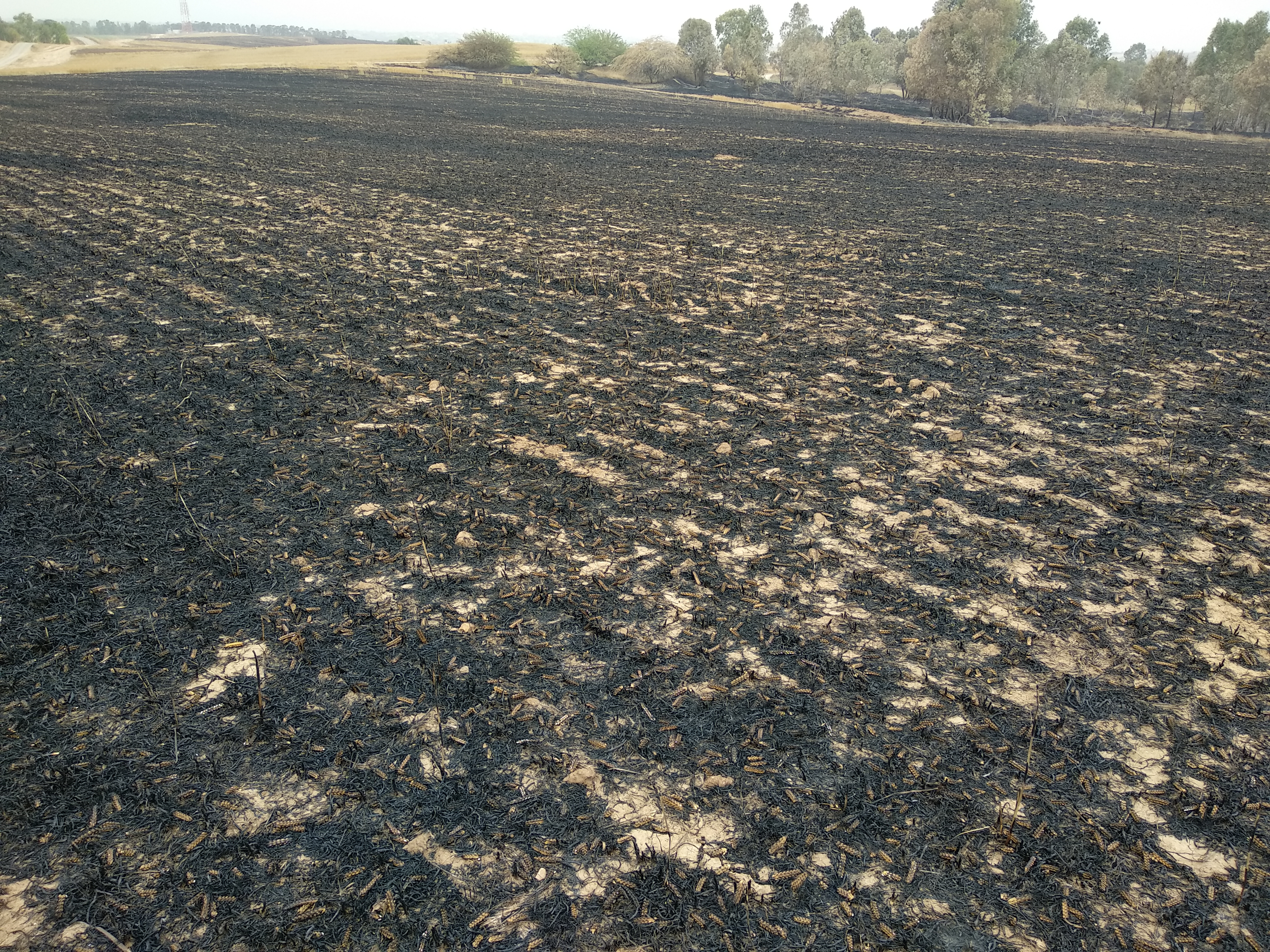
Crop fields near Kibbutz Be'eri burnt by incendiary kite sent from Gaza

In April 2018, Palestinians begun launching incendiary kites and balloons over the border, some of which set fire to Israeli crop fields and forests.

As of early June, roughly 5,000 dunams of Israeli crop fields had been burned by kites launched from Gaza, with an estimated economic loss of US$1.4 million, in addition to 2,100 dunams of Jewish National Fund forests in the area and 4,000 to 5,000 dunams in the Besor Forest Nature Reserve. The New York Times reported one of its journalists sighting "vast stretches of scorched earth", with "losses to Israeli agriculture from flaming kites [being] immense."

==== Compensation for casualties ====
Hamas said on 5 April 2018 that it would offer compensation for people injured or killed by Israeli soldiers while participating in the demonstrations. Hamas spokesperson Hazem Qasem stated that families to those killed would receive $3,000 and families to severely injured $500. Lightly injured persons would receive $200.

=== Israeli tactics ===
The Israeli military deployed soldiers, including snipers and tanks, to the border. Soldiers opened fire on Palestinians approaching the fence with tear gas, rubber bullets, and live ammunition. Soldiers fired from artificial sand berms that overlooked the protests. Israeli tear gas canisters penetrated more than 300 metres (980 ft) into Gaza. An investigation by B'Tselem found that Israeli soldiers launched tear gas at family tents, located 400 to 600 metres (1,300 to 2,000 ft) from the fence, causing hundreds of people to suffer injuries. Protest participants interviewed by B'Tselem reported cases of suffering from tear gas inhalation and injury from tear gas canister impacts.

While the IDF has not publicly disclosed its rules of engagement, press reports indicate that soldiers are permitted to shoot armed Palestinians within 300 metres (980 ft) of the fence and unarmed Palestinians within 100 metres (330 ft). The IDF has stated that its soldiers are advised to first fire warning shots, then wounding shots, before taking fatal shots. On 6 April, the IDF used industrial-sized fans to disperse the smoke and then water cannons in unsuccessful attempts to douse fires from burning tires.

== Worldwide protests ==
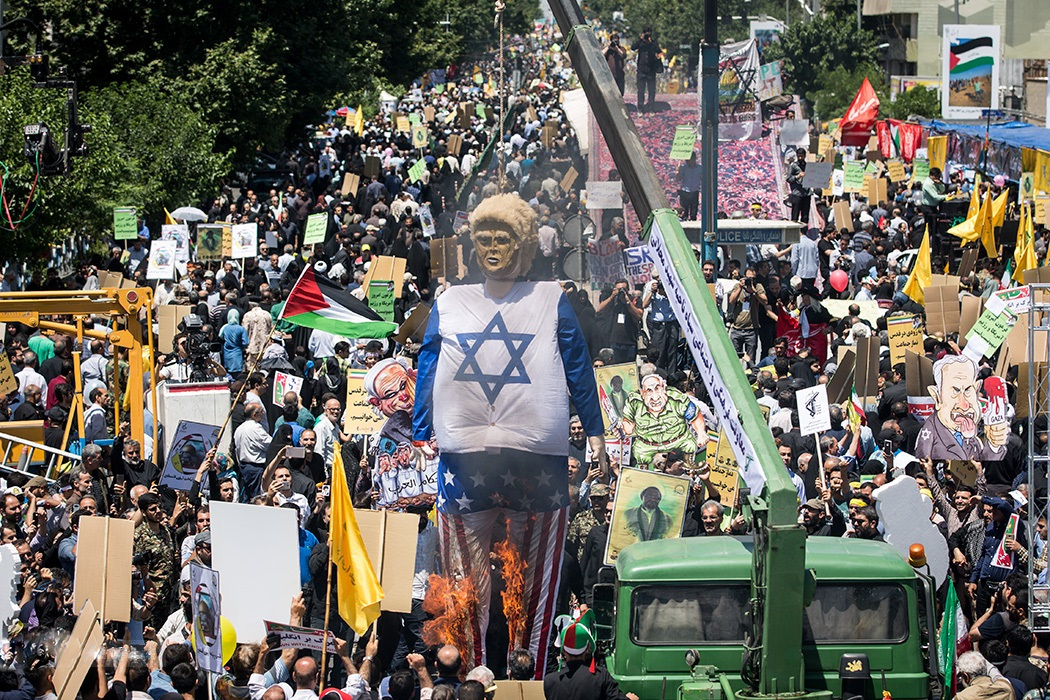
Protest in Tehran, Iran, 18 May 2018

Demonstrations expressing solidarity with the protesters and condemning the use of lethal force by Israeli forces, were held in Israel, the US, the UK, and Australia. Thousands of protesters gathered in Tel Aviv, Washington D.C., Boston, London, Manchester, Sheffield, Bristol, and Melbourne.

Along with 250 others at a Tel Aviv protest, Michael Sfard, a human rights lawyer and political activist, said: "As an Israeli, my duty is to protest against the evils that are done in my name." On 31 March, 150 Israelis gathered in Yad Mordechai near the Gaza–Israel border to protest the IDF's use of deadly force, holding banners reading "Free Gaza," "Stop the Massacre", and "Gaza is Dying." On 2 April, around 300 Israelis gathered in Tel Aviv outside Likud's party headquarters to protest. There was a minor counter-protest in Tel Aviv, where protesters waved Israeli flags and shouted “Israel belongs to Jews.” A small group of Arab Israelis also protested in Jaffa.

In Boston, eight protesters, who chained themselves to the exterior door of the Israeli Consulate, were arrested by police for disorderly conduct, disturbing the peace, and trespassing. In London, anti-Zionist Naturei Karta members joined with protesters to show solidarity with Palestinians.

== Reactions ==
=== States ===
The escalation of violence in Gaza drew concern from the Arab world. Jordan and Egypt condemned Israel's use of force, considering recent developments as harmful to brokering peace. Turkish President Recep Tayyip Erdoğan and Israeli Prime Minister Benjamin Netanyahu exchanged heated remarks over the border clashes; Erdoğan labeled the Israeli response an "inhumane attack" amid growing international criticism of the Israeli military. Erdoğan accused Israel of committing a "genocide", calling Israel a "terrorist state". In response to the anti-Israeli comments by Erdoğan, the Knesset discussed the possibility of recognizing the Armenian genocide.

Australia and United States voiced support for Israel's right to defend itself. Costa Rica, Egypt, France, Germany, Indonesia, Jordan, Morocco, South Africa, Sweden, Turkey, and the Vatican have criticized the actions of Israel or both sides of the conflict.

On 15 May, British Prime Minister Theresa May said, speaking alongside Turkish President Erdoğan, that "There is an urgent need to establish the facts of what happened yesterday through an independent and transparent investigation, including why such a volume of live fire was used and what role Hamas played in events." U.S. Ambassador to the UN, Nikki Haley, said that "Anyone who truly cares about children in Gaza should insist that Hamas immediately stop using children as cannon fodder in its conflict with Israel."

=== Supranational organisations ===
- Arab League: The Arab League condemned the continuous discrimination and violence against peaceful Palestinian protesters. Upon Saudi Arabia's request, the Organization held a summit on 17 May in its headquarters in Cairo on a Ministerial level to discuss a proper response to the continuing human rights violations done by Israel.
- EU: On 4 April, the European Union expressed deep alarm over "the use of live ammunition by Israeli Security Forces as a means of crowd control," and called on Israel to investigate every death and prosecute the perpetrators where appropriate.
- International Criminal Court: On 8 April, Fatou Bensouda, prosecutor for the International Criminal Court, issued a public warning to Israelis and Palestinians that, "violence against civilians – in a situation such as the one prevailing in Gaza – could constitute crimes under the Rome Statute of the International Criminal Court [...], as could the use of civilian presence for the purpose of shielding military activities."
- UN: United Nations Secretary-General, António Guterres, observed that the situation "underlines the urgency of revitalizing the peace process aiming at creating the conditions for a return to meaningful negotiations." Speaking to the UN Security Council in a meeting on the situation in the Middle East, Nickolay Mladenov, UN Special Coordinator for the Middle East Peace, said that Gaza was about to "explode" and called for "actions to prevent another war." UN High Commissioner for Human Rights Zeid bin Ra'ad condemned use of "excessive force" by Israel and said that security forces had to be "held to account."
  - Elizabeth Throssell, a spokesperson for the United Nations High Commissioner for Human Rights, said that the use of deadly force was largely unjustified, since such force may only be used as a last resort when there is an imminent threat of death or serious injury. "An attempt to approach or cross the green-line fence by itself certainly does not amount to a threat to life or serious injury that would justify the use of live ammunition," the office said. The United Nations Special Rapporteur for the Palestinian territories echoed the argument and stated: "The killing of demonstrators in violation of these rules, and within the context of occupation, may amount to willful killing, a grave breach of the Fourth Geneva Convention, as well as a war crime."

=== NGOs ===
Amnesty International: On 27 April, the organization called for worldwide arms embargo on Israel for its "disproportionate response" to the protests.

The Israeli law center Shurat HaDin filed a complaint in the International Criminal Court against Hamas leaders Khaled Mashal, Saleh al-Arouri, and Zahar Jabarin for the use of children as human shields in the conflict along the border based on a clause in the Rome Statute that prohibits recruitment of children under the age of 15 to a militant organization. Shurat HaDin Director Nitzana Darshan-Leitner stated: "The death of a 15-year-old boy near the Gaza border last week was a direct result of the war crimes committed by Hamas leaders against their own people".

=== Individuals ===
On 8 April, Defense Minister of Israel Avigdor Lieberman said: "You have to understand, there are no innocent people in the Gaza Strip. Everyone has a connection to Hamas. Everyone receives a salary from Hamas. Those who are trying to challenge us at the border and breach it belong to Hamas' military wing."

On 15 May, Israel's ambassador to the UK, Mark Regev, said Israel "did everything we could" to avoid the bloodshed at the border with Gaza. He told BBC Radio 4's Today programme: "We use live fire only in a very measured way, in a very surgical way and only when there is no alternative."

Retired British Colonel Richard Kemp said the March was not a peaceful demonstration, but "a deliberate and specific intent by terrorist organizations to penetrate the State of Israel and kill civilians and the IDF has no option except to use lethal force to stop such a dangerous threat."

Legal scholar and European Court of Human Rights judge Sir Stephen Sedley opined that the use of live fire against unarmed protesters was "without much question a major crime".

The Israeli Prime Minister's Arabic-language spokesman Ofir Gendelman tweeted, in response to a video showing a flag with a swastika lying between two Palestinian flags, "Hamas terrorists have planted today right on the Gaza-Israel border this Nazi flag which was flying [between] Palestinian flags. Hamas proudly declares that its aim is to annihilate Israel & the Jewish people. The genocidal message has been received. We will defend our country."

Israeli historian Zeev Sternhell wrote, "the weekly killing on the Gaza Strip border is a campaign of barbarism, exposing the mentality of the society in whose name the army acts: We can do anything we like."

Five former IDF snipers, assisted by Breaking the Silence, published a letter expressing "shame and sorrow" for the killings and stating, "instructing snipers to shoot to kill unarmed demonstrators who pose no danger to human life is another product of the occupation and military rule over millions of Palestinian people, as well as of our country's callous leadership, and derailed moral path."

American columnist Peter Beinart wrote that during the protests, Palestinians were "running towards the Israeli snipers" because their land was fast becoming "uninhabitable", with the UN predicting Gaza would be "unliveable" by 2020.

On 15 May, a group of nine prominent Israelis wrote a letter to The Guardian in which they compared the killings on the previous day to the Sharpeville massacre, and called for international intervention.

== Criticism of media coverage ==
The area of the conflict was subject to intense monitoring. On the Israeli side of the border, observers watched and filmed events using telescopes, long lenses, and feeds from the cameras, drones, quadcopters and tethered surveillance balloons hovering over the sites. Israeli journalists were not permitted by the IDF to approach the area of conflict, but kept two kilometres (1.2 mi) away. Almost from the outset, journalist Isabel Kershner observed that the March had given rise to a "war of words" between the involved parties.

Surveying the media reaction just after the events of 14 May, Haaretz noted that the events were covered extensively, with the violence in Gaza juxtaposed with the opening of the US embassy in Jerusalem. Many headlines focused on the death toll in Gaza and pictures were split between Palestinian protesters wounded and killed alongside pictures of the opening ceremony in Jerusalem. The Star omitted the embassy opening and focused on the pictures from Gaza.

In the aftermath of the conflict, the way a number of mainstream newspaper outlets, including The New York Times, covered the events has become the object of analysis, criticism, and challenge. The political scientist Norman Finkelstein takes exception to what he perceives to be The New York Times portrayal of the March as one in which the protests were described as "armed confrontations in which Israeli snipers return the fire of protesters," notwithstanding the fact that human rights NGOs have stated the demonstrations were "overwhelmingly peaceful." In particular, he mentions articles by David Halbfinger, who was embedded among the Israeli snipers.

An IDF spokesman, Brig. Gen. Ronen Manelis, wrote for The Wall Street Journal that the world's media had fallen for what he said was "a well-funded terrorist propaganda operation" consisting of lies crafted to win "the international propaganda war." In the piece, Manelis claims that the protests were staged, the demonstrators were paid actors, and that Hamas orchestrated the violence to capture headlines. "If," he concluded, "I need to lie like Hamas, then I prefer to tell the truth and lose." The IDF spokesperson Lt. Col. Jonathan Conricus, thought that graphics from the Palestinian side of the border had allowed Hamas to win a PR battle "by a knockout," and attributed the result to an Israeli failure to minimize Palestinian casualties. Likewise, reacting to events just after the first March, retired brigadier-general Shlomo Brom declared: "I categorize what happened as a failure. The Palestinian aim was to raise international consciousness, and to put the Palestinian issue back on the international and Israeli agenda. It succeeded."

Veteran Israeli war correspondent Ron Ben-Yishai complained that Hamas had won the media battle partially because the IDF kept local journalists away from the border, thereby hindering Israeli journalists from documenting "the crowds of Gazans sent by Hamas to commit suicide on the fence." While massive video reporting was available on the Palestinian side of the fence, the IDF only provided the press with a "thin drizzle" of visual evidence, consisting of several dozen unclear images and short clips taken from its security camera coverage of the zone. Critics like Muhammad Shehada, Jamie Stern-Weiner, and Norman Finkelstein wonder why, given its visual and video intelligence, the IDF did not buttress its claims over armed Hamas activity by providing footage.

On 8 April, BBC News anchor Andrew Marr stated that "lots of Palestinian kids" were killed by Israeli forces. Jonathan Sacerdoti claimed that the statement was "completely incorrect and is made up." BBC management ruled that Marr breached editorial guidelines and that the statement "risked misleading audiences on a material point".

On 22 July, Israel's Foreign Ministry spokesman, Emmanuel Nahshon, criticized CNN for "unbalanced coverage of recent events in Gaza" after four Palestinians and one Israeli soldier were killed.

== Gaza war ==
Ahmed Abu Ratima (pref. Artema), one of the organizers of the original Gaza border protests, was seriously injured in an Israeli airstrike during the Gaza war; the airstrike killed five of his family members, including his twelve-year-old son.

== See also ==
- Border barrier for a list of border barriers
- List of violent incidents in the Israeli–Palestinian conflict, 2018
- Aed Abu Amro
- 2019 Gaza economic protests
