= Hani Al-Masdar =

Palestinian athlete and coach (1981–2024)

- Born: April 14, 1981; Al-Musaddar, Gaza Strip, Palestine
- Died: January 6, 2024 (aged 42); Al-Musaddar, Gaza Strip, Palestine
- Cause of death: Israeli airstrike
- Occupation: Coach; Athlete

Hani Abdul Hakim Suleiman Al-Masdar (Arabic: هاني عبد الحكيم سليمان المصدر; April 14, 1981 – January 6, 2024) was a Palestinian athlete and coach. He was born and lived in the village of Al-Musaddar in the central Gaza Strip. He studied at Al-Manfaluti Secondary School and obtained a high school degree from Khaled Bin Al-Walid Secondary School in Nuseirat. He was a player and coach of the Palestine national football team, and he had previously supervised the training of several Palestinian teams, most notably Al-Aqsa, Khadamat Al-Nuseirat, and Deir Al-Balah Union. He led to promotion to the Palestinian League for first-class teams, before supervising the Olympic team.

== Club career ==
Al-Masdar began his career as a player in Al-Maghazi Club, then joined the Gaza Sports Club until he retired from playing in 2018. Hani Al-Masdar did not leave the Gaza Strip during his professional career to continue his work as a coach and achieved a remarkable achievement with Ittihad Deir Al-Balah (اتحاد دير البلح). After promotion from the second division league to league 1 in southern governorates clubs, he continued his work as a coach.

He also participated in many stations with the "Al-Fadaee" Olympic, most notably the Asian qualifiers in 2021 Jordan, 2023 Bahrain, the 2023 West Asian Championship held in Iraq, the 2023 Arab Games in Algeria, and the 2023 Asian Games in China.

== Death ==
Hani Al-Masdar was killed on January 6, 2024, during an Israeli airstrike on Al-Musaddar, the village where Al-Masdar lived, in Deir al-Balah Governorate in the central Gaza Strip during the Gaza war. Many official bodies mourned him, including the Palestinian Football Association.

== See also ==
- Palestinian sports during the Israeli invasion of the Gaza Strip
- List of athletes killed in the Gaza war
