= Palestinian sports during the Gaza war =

Palestinian sports has deteriorated due to the ongoing Israeli invasion of the Gaza Strip. As of 26 July 2024, around 400 Palestinian sportspeople, at least 245 of them footballers (69 children and 176 young men), were killed in Israeli attacks according to the Palestine Olympic Committee and the Palestinian Football Association. By August 2025, more than 800 athletes, including 421 football players, were killed in Gaza and the West Bank. As of June 2026, 1,009 athletes, including 567 in the football sector, have been killed by Israeli attacks. The Israeli invasions have also led to destruction of stadiums and closure of clubs.

== Background ==
The Arab Palestine Sports Federation was founded in 1931 and re-established in 1944. The federation had 55 affiliated sports clubs until the Nakba (the violent displacement and dispossession of Palestinians by Israel) stopped Palestinian national sports and drove most of the Palestinians to exile and refugee camps. After the Oslo Accords in 1993, the Palestinian Football Association joined various international sports federations including FIFA. However, since then, the federation has faced constant challenges in building a sustainable national football infrastructure. This is mainly due to the persistent fragmentation of the Palestinian land and population. However, the arena of sports has emerged as a powerful platform to express solidarity with political causes of Palestine. Arab players and fans—often use sporting events to raise the Palestinian flag. Palestinian football survived the developments of the second intifada from 2000 to 2005, the deepening of the occupation and the five Israeli wars on Gaza, and the national team successfully qualified for three consecutive rounds of the Asian Nations Cup. Palestine was on the verge of the 2026 men's World Cup qualifiers when the latest round of conflict between Hamas and Israel began, leaving the Palestinian National Football Stadium in the Israeli-occupied West Bank potentially unsafe for the tournament. Meanwhile, Gaza's football players are exposed to the full wrath of Israel's war. In recent decades there have been calls to ban Israel from international sporting events in response to the jailing and targeting Palestinian athletes, as well as preventing competitors from Gaza from leaving to join their West Bank teammates to play abroad.

== Killing of Palestinian athletes ==
By December 2023, at least 85 Palestinian athletes, 55 of them footballers, were killed in Israeli attacks, of whom 18 were children and 37 teenagers. In addition, the Palestinian Football Association counts at least 24 managers and technical staff who have been killed. Hani Al-Masry, a former footballer and CEO of the Palestinian National Olympic Team, was among the victims. Israeli forces killed 23-year-old football player Ahmed Daraghmeh in the West Bank. The Arabic football website Kooora introduced him as the best scorer of this team with 6 goals this season. Israel also killed Hani al-Masdar, the coach of the Palestinian Olympic soccer team, who was known as "Abu Abad" in Palestine.

A basketball player, Bassim al-Nabahin, 27, who played for the Al-Breij basketball team, and Football player Rashid Dabbour, 28, who played in Al-Ahli Beit Hanoon team, were also among the dead. Also, two Palestinian volleyball players, Hassan Abu Zuaiter and Ibrahim Qusaya, who played for the national team and the Al-Sadaka Club, were killed in an Israeli attack that targeted the Jabalia camp in the Gaza Strip. Jibril Rajoub, President of the Palestinian Football Federation, stated that the conflict in Gaza initiated by Israel has caused significant damage to the sports and youth movements. Rajoub reported that over 1,000 individuals involved in sports, youth, and scouting have lost their lives. He also alleged that Israeli forces have deliberately attacked Palestinian sports clubs, which he claimed is a clear violation of the Olympic Charter. Paracyclist Ahmed al-Dali of the Gaza Sunbirds was killed by an Israeli airstrike in May 2025. On 3 July, footballer Muhannad Fadl al-Lay was killed by Israeli strike in the Maghazi refugee camp, increasing the death toll of footballers killed in Gaza to 265 and the athlete death toll to 585. On 6 August, Palestinian footballer Suleiman Obeid, known as the "Palestinian Pelé" was killed by Israeli forces while waiting for humanitarian aid.

Makram Daboub, the coach of the Palestine national football team, stated that some of the team's players had experienced significant personal loss, leading to a constant feeling of anxiety for their families.

On 29 June 2026, Palestinian goalkeeper Saleem Al-Ashqar was killed after Israeli forces shot him in Al-Qarara, northeast of Khan Yunis. According to the Palestinian Football Association, he was the 1,009th Palestinian sportsperson killed by Israeli forces since the start of the war, as well as the 567th Palestinian killed from the football sector alone.

== Other effects of the war ==
=== Starvation ===
Mohammed Hamada, a Palestinian weightlifter who had previously competed in weightlifting at the 2020 Summer Olympics and won gold at the 2022 Junior World Weightlifting Championships, lost 35 lbs (15.8 kg) in a month due to starvation. Though he was able to leave Palestine and travel to Bahrain and later the Olympic qualifiers in Thailand, his lifting ability was seriously diminished, and he did not qualify for the 2024 Summer Olympics.

=== Closure of sports clubs ===
The Lajee Celtic football club, also informally referred to as Aida Celtic, has suspended all operations due to the escalating violence that has occurred throughout the occupied West Bank. Mohammad Azzeh, the director of the Lajee cultural centre, states that the taking the decision of halting the activities of Lajee Celtic and the academy was "hard but necessary" since felt obligated to safeguard the children and staff from imminent raids by Israeli soldiers on the Aida camp. For Mohammad Azzeh the football team has a meaning beyond sports - it plays a role in the resistance to the Israeli occupation.

=== Stadiums ===
In January 2024, video emerged of Israeli troops using Yarmouk Stadium as a temporary jail for Palestinian prisoners. A group of armed troops and tanks surrounded the field and people with eyes covered, some "stripped down to their underwear". According to the non-profit Euro-Mediterranean Human Rights Monitor, the Israeli army detained hundreds of Palestinians from the Sheikh Radwan neighborhood of Gaza City, including dozens of women who have been taken to Yarmouk Stadium. According to the human rights organization "Palestinian males, including children as young as 10 years old and elderly people over the age of 70, were forced to take off all of their clothes except their underwear and line up in a humiliating manner in front of the women detained in the same stadium".

Many stadiums in Gaza were among the structures destroyed by Israeli air and artillery attacks, and some football fields have been repurposed as temporary burial sites for some of the deceased due to the overcrowding or inaccessibility of many cemeteries.

=== Discrimination against Palestinian players ===
In March 2025, Ahmed Taha, who plays for F.C. Kafr Qasim in the Israeli Liga Leumit, choose to play for the Palestine national football team. Upon his return to Kafr Qasim, players from opponent Maccabi Jaffa refused to shake Taha's hand prior to a match. Israel's Minister for Sport and Culture Miki Zohar also declared, "a player in the national league in Israel came to play in the uniform of the Palestinian national team - as if it were a matter of course. This is an event that cannot be ignored. A player who plays in the national league of the State of Israel cannot represent an entity that does not recognize its right to exist."

Video also emerged of Palestine national team player Tamer Seyam arguing with Israeli soldiers at a checkpoint. The soldiers were demanding that Seyam remove his Palestinian national team top.

== Participation in international sporting events ==
Palestine sent eight athletes to the 2024 Summer Olympics. One athlete, Omar Yaser Ismail, gained a spot in Taekwondo by winning an Olympic qualifier, while the other seven were given wild card spots.

The Palestinian Campaign for the Academic and Cultural Boycott of Israel reported that, according to the Palestinian Football Association, 69 Palestinian athletes of Olympic sports were killed in Israeli attacks between October 2023 and July 2024, including Nagham Abu Samra, a karateka who was expected to compete in the event, as well as Majed Abu Maraheel, Palestine's first Olympic flagbearer, and Hani Al-Masdar, coach of the Palestinian Olympic football team.

Alaa Al-Dali, a para-cyclist from the Gaza Sunbirds, left Gaza in April 2024 in hopes of participating in the 2024 Summer Paralympics. Although he competed in several qualifying rounds, he ultimately did not qualify.

== Reactions ==
The Jordan Football Association called on the world sporting community "to take decisive action to stop the aggression against Palestinians in Gaza and the occupied territories" through a statement, so that it is isolated from international sports. The Palestinian Football Association also announced sending similar messages to FIFA and the International Olympic Committee, citing the "horrific images" at the time of Israel's attack on Yarmouk Stadium, Gaza Strip. Other movements, such as the Boycott Divestment Sanctions (BDS) movement, have long supported the expulsion or suspension of the Israel Football Association due to hosting FIFA-sanctioned matches in the West Bank Israeli settlements, a territory occupied by Israel since 1967. The killing of Palestinian athletes also prompted athletes around the world to launch campaigns to support Israel's ban from the 2024 Summer Olympics. They were seeking a full investigation into possible violations of the Olympic Charter, which considers sport as a fundamental human right.

Both FIFA and the International Olympic Committee have avoided a statement condemning the war between Israel and Gaza and the subsequent humanitarian crisis, unlike how they handled Russian invasion of Ukraine. "FIFA has for years actively shielded Israel from accountability for its ongoing war crimes and violations of FIFA's own statutes through its inclusion of teams in illegal Israeli settlements on stolen Palestinian land. FIFA has gone so far as to sanction not the illegal settlement clubs but fan clubs expressing support for Palestinian human rights. This is how these hypocritical bodies express 'neutrality'", BDS announced. Sports writer Dave Zirin pointed out the "apparente hypocrisy" in comparison to the suspension of the Russian Olympic Committee for violating the Olympic Charter after the invasion of Ukraine. Jules Boykoff, author of the book What Are the Olympics For writes: "The double standards are glaring. Why has the IOC been so conspicuously silent about Israel compared to Russia? If taking over sports facilities are a red line, why silence as Israel converts Gaza's historic Yarmouk football stadium into an internment camp? The inconsistencies are glaring, to say the least."

== See also ==
- Boycotts of Israel in sports
