= United Nations Independent Commission on the 2018 Gaza border protests =

United Nations inquiry into Gaza border protests

The United Nations Independent Commission on the 2018 Gaza border protests was an independent commission of the United Nations created by the United Nations Human Rights Council on 18 May 2018 to investigate the Israeli response to Palestinian refugee protests in the Gaza Strip. Israel was investigated for its use of tear gas and live rounds against demonstrating Gazans.

== Background ==
In a special session, the UN Human Rights Council backed a resolution to establish the Commission and condemned "the disproportionate and indiscriminate use of force by the Israeli occupying forces against Palestinian civilians." The commission was asked to produce a final report by March 2019.

== Mission members ==
Santiago Canton (Argentina) served as chair, with Kaari Betty Murungi (Kenya) and Sara Hossain (Bangladesh) serving as members of the commission. David Michael Crane (United States), the original chair, resigned the position on 22 August 2018 "due to a personal circumstance that has arisen".

== Reports ==
On 28 February 2019, the Commission said it had "reasonable grounds" to believe Israeli soldiers may have committed war crimes and shot at journalists, health workers and children during protests in Gaza in 2018." Israel refused to take part in the inquiry and rejected the report.

On 18 March 2019, the inquiry presented its full report following the release of a summary document the month prior that reported 189 Palestinian dead, 183, including 32 children, by live ammunition. Israeli authorities were urged to step up their inquiries into shootings by Israeli troops of Palestinian demonstrators.

== Israeli investigations ==
On 5 April 2018, the IDF announced that its Southern Command would conduct an internal investigation into the deaths of civilians during the prior week. Brigadier General Moti Baruch was appointed to lead a second government investigation. Press reports indicate that Baruch's investigation will focus on incidents which appear to have a cause for inquiry.
