= Al-Mughraqa =

al-Mughraqa
- Municipality type C

Arabic transcription(s)
  - Arabic: المغراقة
  - Latin: Abu Middein (official)
- Location of al-Mughraqa within Palestine
- Coordinates: 31°28′03.00″N 34°24′35.00″E
- State: State of Palestine
- Governorate: Gaza

Government
  - Type: Municipality
  - Head of Municipality: Yousef Abu Hweishel

Area
  - Total: 3.3 km^{2} (1.3 sq mi)

Population (2017)
  - Total: 11,458
  - Density: 3,500/km^{2} (9,000/sq mi)

Al-Mughraqa (Arabic: المغراقة, also known as Abu Middein) is a Palestinian town in the Gaza Governorate of the Gaza Strip, located six kilometers southwest of Gaza City. According to the Palestinian Central Bureau of Statistics (PCBS), al-Mughraqa had a population of 11,458 in 2017. The town's alternate name, "Abu Middein" derives from the Bedouin Abu Middein tribe that inhabits the area, part of the larger al-Hanajreh tribal confederation.

== History ==
In 1996, a Bronze Age settlement dating to the early 2nd millennium BC was discovered in the town and named al-Moghraqa.

In 2002, during the Second Intifada, Israel carried out demolitions of Palestinian homes in al-Mughraqa.

The 2014 Gaza War caused damage to al-Mughraqa's water network; in 2015 the municipality had a non-revenue water rate of 58%, amongst the highest in the Gaza Strip.

In late 2023, al-Mughraqa's residents fled south to escape the Israeli invasion of the Gaza Strip. They began to return in February 2025 following a ceasefire. The damage to al-Mughraqa was extensive, encompassing buildings and agricultural land, and the area was left without running water or an electrical supply. The Israeli military established the Netzarim Corridor which spanned the width of the Gaza Strip and passed through al-Mughraqa. An assessment by UNOSAT in December 2024 identified more than 2,800 buildings in al-Mughraqa that had been damaged or destroyed.

== Education ==
Al-Azhar University established a new campus in al-Mughraqa with international funding. The campus was destroyed during the Gaza War in 2024.

The Moghraqa Preparatory Girls and Moghraqa Elementary Boys schools were damaged during the Gaza War.

== Demographics ==
As of 2010, most of al-Mughraqa's residents were refugees. In 2017 it had 11,458 inhabitants.

== Economy ==
Al-Mughraqa is mostly rural, and most employed inhabitants work in agriculture, cultivating tomatoes, cucumbers, and lemons. The Gaza war caused widespread destruction of al-Mughraqa's agricultural land as well as its built environment.
