= Hanajira =

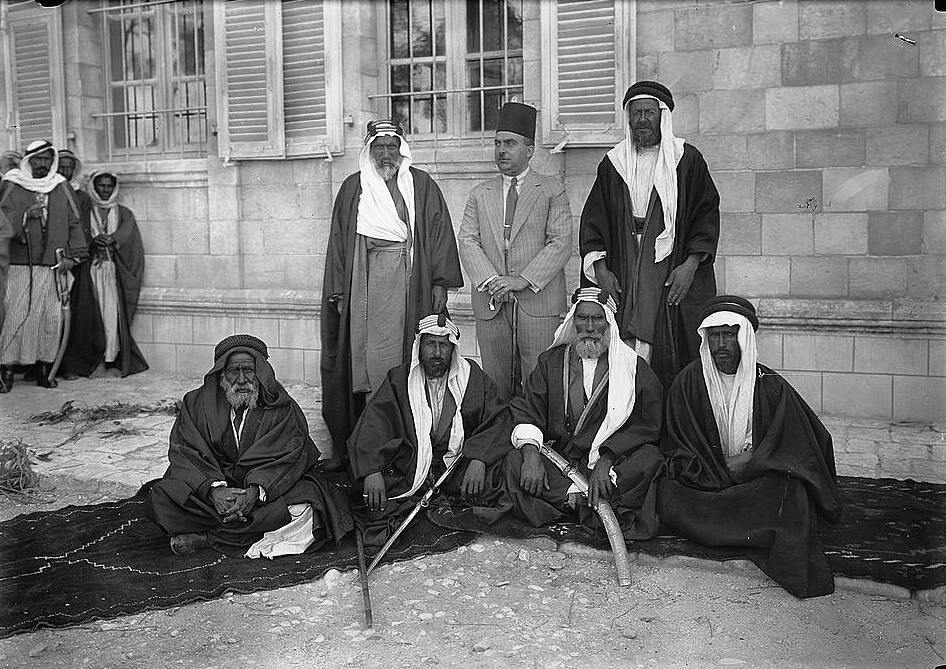
Members of the Hanajira tribe in Beersheba. Seated third from left is Sheikh Freih Abu Middein, chief of the Hanajira tribe. Standing in the center is Aref al-Aref, Palestinian journalist and later mayor of East Jerusalem

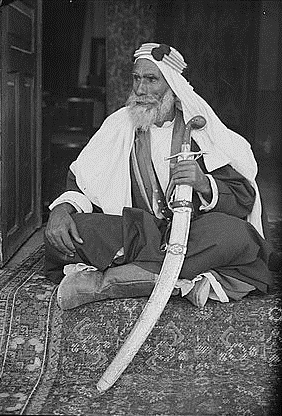
Tribal chief Sheikh Freih Abu Middein, during his mayoral term in Beersheba, early 1920s

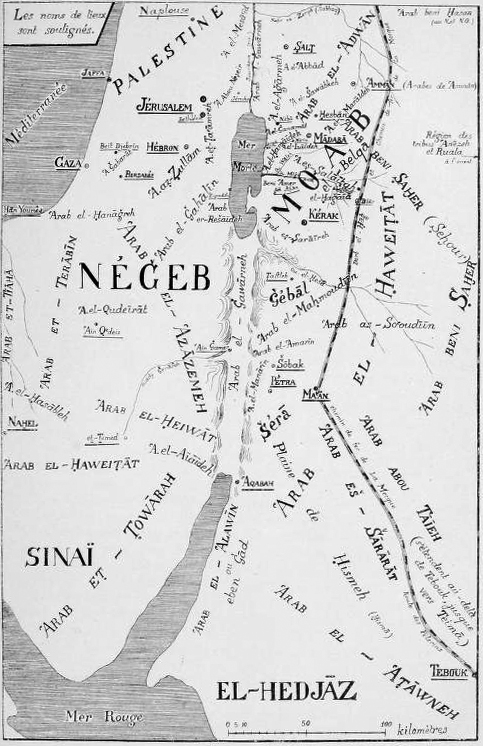
1908 map of Bedouin tribes inhabiting the Negev Desert. Al-Hanajira is spelled "Arab al-Hanagreh" in the map

Al-Hanajira (also Arab al-Hanajira, al-Hanajra or el-Hanajreh) was one of the five principal Bedouin tribes inhabiting the Negev Desert prior to the 1948 Arab-Israeli War. Its territory stretched north-south between Deir al-Balah and Gaza and east to the lands of the Tarabin bedouin, straddling the Hejaz Railway line. Under the British Mandate, the territory was divided between its Gaza and Beersheba. The largest clan was Abu Middein. In the 1931 British census of Palestine, Abu Middein numbered 1,419, Nuseirat numbered 1,104, Sumeiri 772, and al-Dawahra 461, bringing the total to 3,735. By the summer of 1946 the population increased to 7,125. In 1981 the population living in the Gaza Strip was roughly 10,000.

== History ==
In 1830, the Acre-based governor of Gaza, Abdullah Pasha, concentrated his forces to put down a rebellion in Jabal Nablus, leaving Gaza and the Negev relatively unsecured. The Bani Attiya tribe of Wadi Araba sought to exploit the lack of state authority and encroached upon the territories of the Negev Bedouin tribes, including the Beersheba plains, without the permission of Salman Ali Azzam al-Huzayl, the Tiyaha chief of the area. Al-Huzayl subsequently formed a coalition with the Hanajira and evicted the Bani Atiyya after four battles at Wadi Ar'ara, Tell Rakhima, Wadi Abu Tulul and al-Mashash. The Palestine Exploration Fund reported that in the late 19th century, the Hanajira grew tobacco and watermelons at Khirbet Emkemen between Khan Yunis and Rafah.

During the British Mandate period between 1920 and 1947, the overall chief of the al-Hanajira and one of the influential tribal chiefs in the Negev was Sheikh Freih Farhan Abu Middein. He served with the British Army during World War I, and after the Mandate's establishment, he was appointed to the Tribal Court and the Advisory Council of the High Commissioner. In the early 1920s he became the mayor of Beersheba, his place of residence, and in 1922 became a member of the Legislative Council. The chief of the Nuseirat during this period was Sheikh Aaysh Farhan al-Msaddar, who was later succeeded by Sheikh Freih al-Msaddar in 1940.

In 1946 Sheikh Freih al-Msaddar became a major figure within Jamal al-Husayni's Palestine Arab Party in the Beersheba region and the Arab Higher Committee's finance committee. In April 1948 Sheikh Freih al-Msaddar was among the notables who welcomed volunteers from the Muslim Brotherhood coming from Egypt to fight Israeli forces in Palestine. The head of the Sumeiri tribe during the Mandate period was Selim Abdullah al-Sumeiri, who was succeeded Sheikh Juma'h al-Sumeiri, while the head of al-Dawadra was Ahmad Abu Daher.

Towards 1948 the Hanajira largely transformed into a settled agricultural community. Following the Israeli Army's main offensive against Egyptian forces in the Gaza region and its capture of the western Negev Desert in late December 1948 during the First Arab-Israeli War, the Israelis expelled the Abu Middein, Sumeiri and al-Dawahra clans to the Gaza Strip, while the Nsirat were either expelled to the Gaza Strip or Jordan. After the 1967 Six-Day War, many of the Nsirat were evicted by Israeli authorities and relocated to Jordan.

Freih Mustafa Abu Middein, the grandson of the Abu Middein clan's former chief Sheikh Freih Farhan, was appointed the Minister of Justice by then-Palestinian Authority chairman Yasser Arafat in the 1990s.

== Education ==
Out of a population of 7,125, 500 members of the al-Hanajira clan were literate in 1947. They attended two schools, the Hanajirat Abu Middein School founded 12 kilometers south of Gaza in 1924 and the Nuseirat School founded 5 kilometers east of Deir al-Balah in 1944. The former was divided into four grade levels with one educator and had 75 pupils, while the latter was divided into three grade levels and had 69 pupils.

== See also ==
- Al-Mughraqa
- Al-Musaddar
- Nuseirat (camp)
- 'Azazme

== Bibliography ==
- Abu-Rabia, Aref (2001). A Bedouin Century: Education and Development Among the Negev Tribes in the 20th Century. Berghahn Books. ISBN 1571818324.
- Gilbar, Gad G., ed. (1990). Ottoman Palestine, 1800-1914: Studies in Economic and Social History. BRILL Archives. ISBN 9004077855.
- Palestine Oriental Society (1948). The Journal of the Palestine Oriental Society. Vol. 21. The Society.
