= Gaza Sunbirds =

Para-cycling team based in Gaza, Palestine

- Sport: Para cycling
- Founded: 2020
- Location: Gaza Strip, Palestine

The Gaza Sunbirds are a para-cycling team based in the Gaza Strip, Palestine. The team was formed in 2020 by Alaa al-Dali and Karim Ali. The team was established to provide athletic opportunities for disabled athletes in Gaza, many of whom sustained injuries due to Israeli airstrikes or sniper fire.

Beyond its role as a competitive sports team, the Gaza Sunbirds have become a symbol of advocacy, using cycling to amplify the voices of disabled athletes and their community.

In October 2023, the team expanded its mission to include humanitarian aid distribution, initially delivering assistance by bicycle to displaced and injured civilians in Gaza. While most of the team remains in Gaza, continuing aid efforts and cycling when possible, two athletes—Alaa al-Dali and Abu Asfour—have been evacuated and are actively competing.

As of May 2025, the Sunbirds have distributed $450,000 in aid throughout Gaza.

== History ==
Alaa al-Dali became a cyclist at a young age. In early 2018, he qualified to compete at that year's Asian Games, but was struggling to obtain a permit from the Israeli government to leave the Gaza Strip. In March 2018, he attended the Great March of Return in his cycling gear. While at the protest, he was shot in the leg by an Israeli sniper, shattering his bone. His leg ultimately had to be amputated. While recovering, he met Karim Ali, and over the next year the duo decided to found a para-cycling project. He also adapted a bicycle so he could continue to ride, and began relearning to ride two months after his amputation.

In 2020, the two officially founded the Gaza Sunbirds, and had ten members by the end of the year. Ali provides support from London.

The Israeli blockade of Gaza has severely limited access to bicycles, prosthetic limbs, and adaptive equipment. The team modifies standard bicycles for cyclists who have lost legs, but obtaining specialized paracycling gear remains a major challenge. The team’s attempts to compete internationally have also been repeatedly blocked by Israeli exit permit denials.

By 2023, the team had 20 members and held five weekly training sessions, including one for teenagers. At one time the group had around 50 members. The group organized fundraising events to pay for equipment and to raise money for other groups. Some of their group rides were along the coastline or Salah al-Din Road, while others were as long as 55 miles, from the Rafah Border Crossing to the Erez Crossing.

The team is featured in a documentary films created by filmmaker Flavia Cappellini.

== Gaza war and aid efforts ==
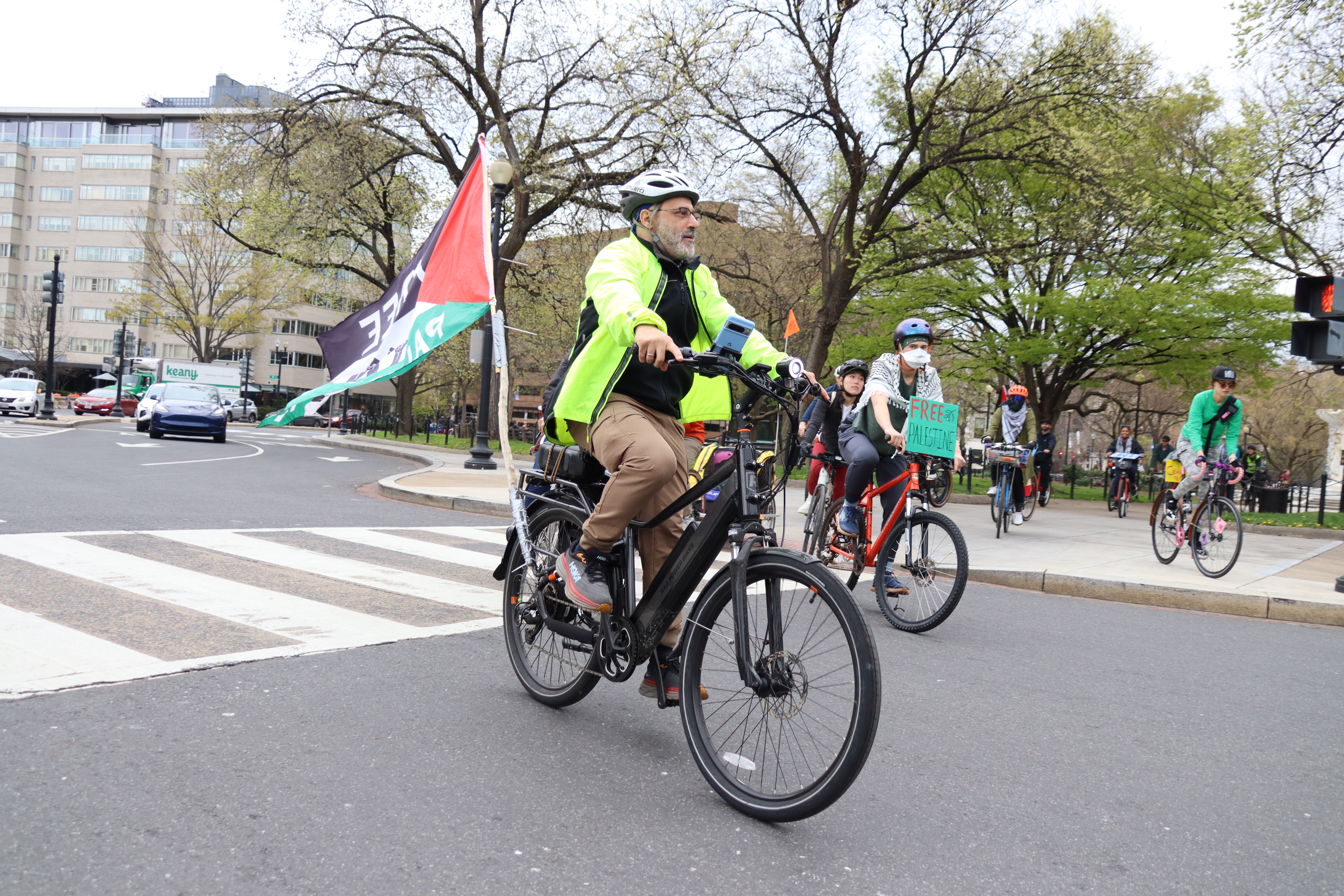
"Great Ride of Return" in support of Gaza Sunbirds in March 2024 in Washington, D.C.

Following the onset of the Gaza war in October 2023, the Gaza Sunbirds expanded their mission beyond cycling, raising money from international supporters and utilizing their bicycles to deliver essential aid to displaced civilians. In collaboration with the Sharek Youth Forum, they established a displacement camp in Deir al-Balah. The war has impacted the team's members, who have faced displacement, poverty, and health issues. Cycling communities worldwide have demonstrated solidarity by organizing rides to raise awareness and support for the Gaza Sunbirds. The group also started the Athletes for Palestine campaign, to organize support for Palestine among professional athletes.

In April 2024, team members Abu Asfour, Alaa al-Dali, and coach Abu Hassan were evacuated to pursue qualification for the 2024 Summer Paralympics. Despite participating in qualifiers in Belgium and Italy, the impact of war and displacement severely disrupted their training, preventing successful qualification.

As of 2025, the Gaza Sunbirds have distributed over $400,000 worth of aid, including: meal parcels, hygiene kits, clothing, infant care products, and bicycles.

On 19 May 2025, Gaza Sunbirds member Ahmed al-Dali was killed by an Israeli airstrike in Khan Yunis. He had been mistakenly declared dead in the 2014 Israeli airstrike in which he lost his leg. A cousin of the team's founder, he joined the team in 2022. The Gaza Sunbirds released a statement urging the British government to suspend arm sales to Israel.

== See also ==
- Palestinian sports during the Israeli invasion of the Gaza Strip
