= Al-Musaddar =

al-Musaddar
- Municipality type D (Village council)

Arabic transcription(s)
  - Arabic: المُصَدّر
- Interactive map of al-Musaddar
- Coordinates: 31°24′52″N 34°22′31″E
- State: State of Palestine
- Governorate: Deir al-Balah

Government
  - Type: Village council

Population (2017)
  - Total: 2,587

Al-Musaddar (Arabic: المُصَدّر) is a Palestinian village in the central Gaza Strip, part of the Deir al-Balah Governorate east of Deir al-Balah, south of the Maghazi refugee camp and west of the border with Israel. In the 1997 census its population was 1,277. Al-Musaddar had a population of 2,587 in 2017 according to the Palestinian Central Bureau of Statistics (PCBS). The area is the site of a local fish farm and a sports center funded by USAID, which was targeted by the Israeli Air Force in 2014.

The village was a frequent target of Israeli bombing during the Gaza war.

== See also ==
- Hanajira
