= Ronen Manelis =

Israeli soldier

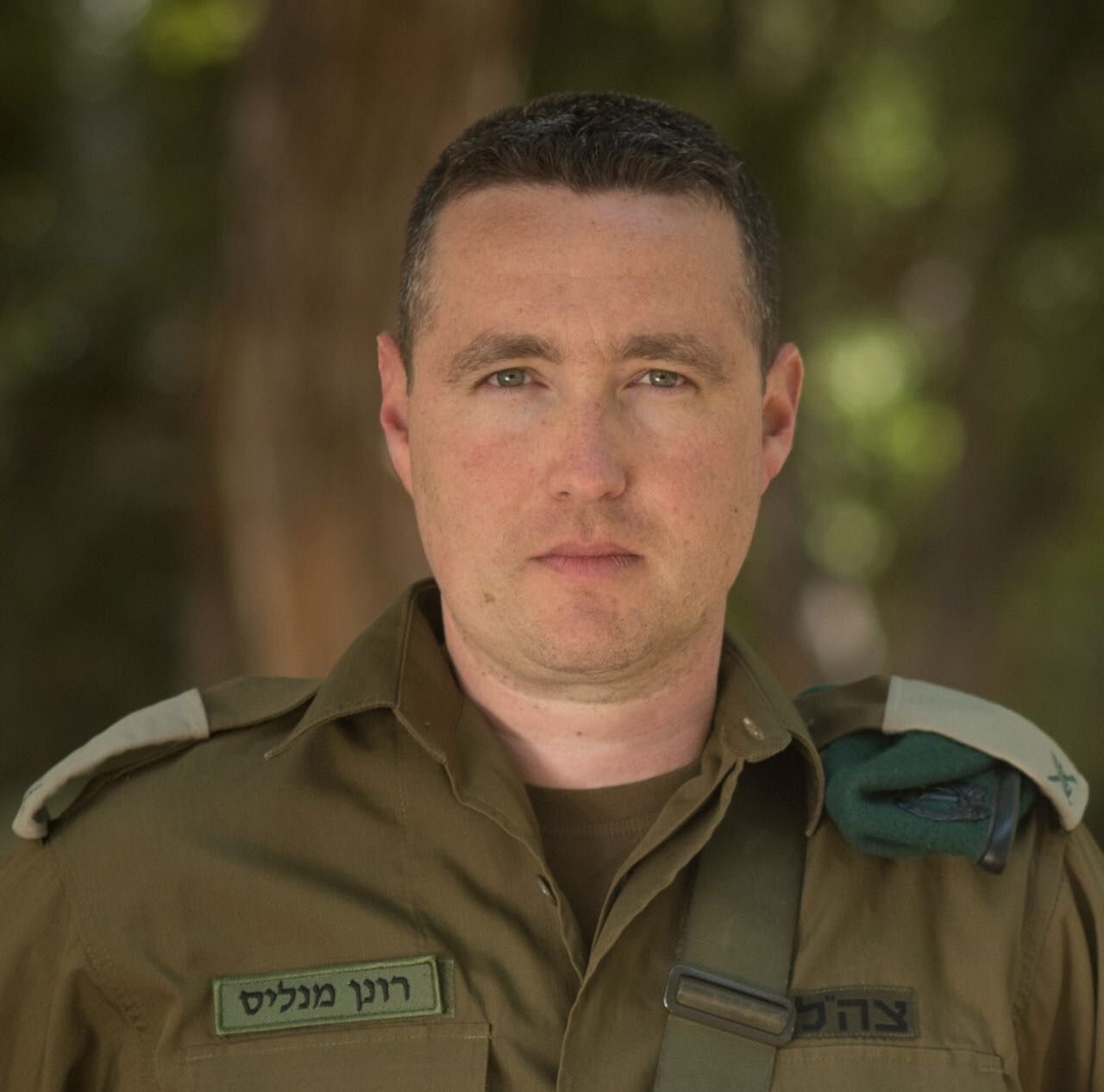
Brig. Gen. Manelis

Brigadier General Ronen Manelis (Hebrew: רונן מָנֵלִיס; born 1979) was the Israeli Defense Forces (IDF) Spokesperson between May 18, 2017, and September 15, 2019. Prior to his position as IDF Spokesperson, Manelis served as Assistant to the Chief of the General Staff.

== Biography ==
Ronen Manelis was born in January 1979 in Jerusalem, and grew up in Beit Shemesh. He enlisted in the IDF in 1997 and has served in various positions in the Field Intelligence (now Combat Intelligence) Corps and in the Intelligence Directorate of the General Staff.

Manelis served as the intelligence officer of the Paratroopers Brigade's reconnaissance company from 1999 to 2000, during the South Lebanon conflict. He went on to serve as the Head Intelligence Officer of the Samaria Regional Brigade from 2003 to 2005. From 2009 to 2010, Manelis served as the Head of a Branch in the Research Division of the Intelligence Directorate. From 2010 to 2012, Menelis served as the Head of the Lebanon Branch of the Northern Command. He also was the Chief Intelligence Officer of the Gaza Division from 2012 to 2014, and served as the Chief Intelligence Officer of the Depth Command from 2014 to 2015.

When Gadi Eisenkot served as the Head of the Operations Directorate and as the Commander of the Northern Command, Manelis served as the head of his office. He later served as Lt. Gen. Eisenkot's assistant when Eisenkotf was appointed Chief of the General Staff from 2015 to 2017. In February 2017, Chief of General Staff Eisenkot decided to appoint Manelis to the position of IDF Spokesperson. On May 18, 2017, Manelis entered the position and was awarded his current rank of brigadier general.

Manelis received a B.A. in history from the Hebrew University of Jerusalem and received his M.A. in political science from Tel Aviv University. He is married, has two children, and currently lives in Mazkeret Batya.
