= United Nations General Assembly Resolution ES-10/22 =

UN General Assembly Resolution ES-10/22

UN General Assembly Resolution ES-10/22
- In favour Against Abstentions Absent Non member
- Date: 12 December 2023
- Meeting no.: 10th Emergency Special Session (continuation)
- Code: A/ES-10/22 (Document)
- Subject: Protection of civilians and upholding legal and humanitarian obligations.
- Voting summary: 153 voted for; 10 voted against; 23 abstained
- Result: Adopted

United Nations General Assembly Resolution ES-10/22 is a resolution of the tenth emergency special session of the United Nations General Assembly calling for an immediate ceasefire in the Gaza war, "immediate and unconditional" hostage release, "ensuring humanitarian access" and that "all parties comply with their obligations under international law".

== Procedures and background ==
On 27 October 2023, the General Assembly passed resolution ES-10/21 calling for a humanitarian truce with a 121 votes for, 14 against and 44 abstentions.

ES-10/22 followed a similar motion calling for an immediate ceasefire and release of hostages in the UN Security Council (UNSC) proposed by the UAE. The resolution received 13 votes for and 1 abstention with the US vetoing it.

The resolution proposed by Egypt received an amendment by Austria, which inserted the phrase "held by Hamas and other groups," in relation to the hostages held by Hamas and other groups in Gaza, and inserting the word "immediate" when referring to ensuring that humanitarian access be maintained, which did not gain the two-thirds majority required, with 89 votes for, 61 against and 21 abstentions, so was not adopted. An amendment from the United States of America, calling for wording rejecting and condemning "heinous terrorist attacks by Hamas that took place in Israel starting 7 October 2023 and the taking of hostages" in resolution's first paragraph, garnered 84 votes for, 62 against and 25 abstentions so did not reach the two-thirds threshold to be carried.

== Voting record ==
| In favour (153) States sponsoring (marked †) | Abstaining (23) | Against (10) | Absent (7) |
|---|---|---|---|
| Afghanistan†; Albania; Algeria†; Andorra; Angola†; Antigua and Barbuda†; Armenia; Australia; Azerbaijan†; Bahamas†; Bahrain†; Bangladesh†; Barbados†; Belarus†; Belgium†; Belize†; Benin†; Bhutan; Bolivia†; Bosnia and Herzegovina†; Botswana†; Brazil†; Brunei†; Burundi; Cambodia†; Canada; Central African Republic†; Chad†; Chile†; China†; Colombia†; Comoros†; Congo†; Costa Rica†; Côte d'Ivoire; Croatia; Cuba†; Cyprus; Democratic Republic of the Congo; Denmark; Djibouti†; Dominica†; Dominican Republic; Ecuador; Egypt†; El Salvador†; Eritrea†; Estonia; Ethiopia†; Fiji†; Finland†; France; Gabon; Gambia†; Ghana; Greece; Grenada†; Guinea; Guinea Bissau†; Guyana†; Honduras†; Iceland†; India; Indonesia†; Iran; Iraq†; Ireland†; Jamaica†; Japan; Jordan†; Kazakhstan; Kenya†; Kuwait†; Kyrgyzstan†; Laos†; Latvia; Lebanon† / Lesotho†; Libya†; Liechtenstein; Luxembourg†; Madagascar; Malaysia†; Maldives†; Mali; Malta†; Mauritania†; Mauritius; Mexico†; Monaco; Mongolia; Montenegro; Morocco†; Mozambique†; Myanmar†; Namibia†; Nepal; New Zealand; Nicaragua†; Niger; Nigeria†; North Korea†; North Macedonia; Norway†; Oman†; Pakistan; Peru†; Philippines†; Poland; Portugal†; Qatar†; Moldova; Russia†; Rwanda; Saint Kitts and Nevis†; Saint Lucia†; Saint Vincent and the Grenadines†; Samoa; San Marino†; Saudi Arabia†; Senegal†; Serbia; Seychelles; Sierra Leone; Singapore†; Slovenia†; Solomon Islands; Somalia†; South Africa†; South Korea; Spain†; Sri Lanka†; Sudan†; Suriname†; Sweden; Switzerland; Syria; Tajikistan†; Tanzania; Thailand†; Timor-Leste†; Trinidad and Tobago†; Tunisia†; Tuvalu; Turkey†; Uganda†; United Arab Emirates†; Uzbekistan†; Vanuatu; Vietnam†; Yemen†; Zambia†; Zimbabwe† | Argentina; Bulgaria; Cabo Verde; Cameroon; Equatorial Guinea; Georgia; Germany; Hungary; Italy; Lithuania; Malawi; Marshall Islands; Netherlands; Palau; Panama; Romania; Slovakia; South Sudan; Togo; Tonga; Ukraine; United Kingdom; Uruguay | Austria; Czech Republic; Guatemala; Israel; Liberia; Micronesia; Nauru; Papua New Guinea; Paraguay; United States | Burkina Faso; Eswatini; Haiti; Kiribati; São Tomé and Príncipe; Turkmenistan†; Venezuela† (Note: Venezuela was suspended from voting in the 76th session and the 11th emergency special session owing to its failure to pay dues in the previous two years, for which it did not receive a special waiver from the Assembly.) |
Observer States: Holy See and State of Palestine†

== Response ==
On December 13, Australian Foreign Minister Penny Wong said that Australia supported the resolution out of concern for civilians in Gaza Strip, adding that "Australia has consistently affirmed Israel's right to defend itself...in doing so, we have said as Israel must respect international humanitarian law, civilians and civilian infrastructure, including hospitals." Reuters described this as it as "a rare split with...the United States" and noted that Canada, Australia and New Zealand released a joint statement on December 12 supporting the ceasefire. Riyad Mansour, the Palestinian Ambassador to the United Nations, described the vote as "historic" and said the resolution demands an end to the conflict, and said "we will not rest until we see compliance of Israel with this demand." The Israeli Permanent Representative to the United Nations, Gilad Erdan argued that the resolution was "disgraceful" attempt to restrain Israel, and claimed that "continuing Israel's operation in Gaza is the only way any hostages will be released." He also claimed that supporting the resolution gave terrorists "a free pass," declared that "a ceasefire will prolong the death and destruction in the region" and said the resolution was "hypocritical".

Mathu Joyini, South Africa's UN representative, invoked South Africa's painful experience with apartheid and said that countries need to take action "in accordance with international law" and called the resolution "an opportunity...to illustrate that the [UN]...is not tone-deaf to the suffering of the most vulnerable." Munir Akram, the Pakistani permanent representative to the U.N., denounced the amendments proposed by the US and Austria as "condemn[ing] only one side but exonerate the other" and arguing that blame "has to be placed on both parties, especially on Israel," and noted that if Hamas was named, but not Israel, it "provide[s] a justification to the Israeli war machine to continue its roulette wheel of death." Linda Thomas-Greenfield, the US ambassador to the UN, stated that the US saw the humanitarian situation in Gaza as "dire" and that "civilians must be protected with international humanitarian law," she urged nations to support an amendment condemning Hamas, and said that a "ceasefire...would be temporary at best, and dangerous at worst...to Israelis...and...Palestinians." Izzat Al-Rishq, member of the Hamas Political Bureau welcomed the resolution and condemned what he described as a "war of genocide and ethnic cleansing" against Palestinians.

Abdulaziz Alwasil, the Saudi ambassador to the UN, supported the resolution, saying Saudi Arabia was voting in favor to end "the suffering caused by an inhumane military attack by the Israeli occupation forces," called for an immediate ceasefire to end the conflict, and the need for "a comprehensive and just solution for the Palestinian question" aligned with the Arab Peace Initiative, the two-state solution, and establishment of "a Palestinian state with Jerusalem as its capital." The Chinese Permanent Representative to the United Nations, Zhang Jun stated that the events in Gaza "is a tragedy, and we must do more." In a press release on December 12, Council on American–Islamic Relations National Executive Director Nihad Awad expressed support for the resolution and called on the US government to "change course" and for countries across the world to "pressure the Israeli government to end its campaign of terror in Gaza." In a statement to reporters supporting Canada's vote in favor of the resolution, Foreign Affairs Minister Mélanie Joly said "from the very beginning we have said that Israel has the right to defend itself. How Israel defends itself matters...What is unfolding before our eyes will only enhance the cycle of violence. This will not lead to the durable defeat of Hamas." The Canadian Ambassador to the UN, Bob Rae told CBC that the "status quo" of the fighting is not sustainable "from a humanitarian perspective" while Liberal Party parliament members Anthony Housefather and Marco Mendicino disagreed with Canada's UN vote.

On 19 December, a statement from the Liberian information ministry claimed that the nation's president, George Weah, had intervened to reverse its vote on the resolution, from opposing a ceasefire to supporting a ceasefire. Liberia was the only African member-state to vote against the ceasefire. President Weah claimed the Liberian diplomats at the UN voted on the matter without his support.

== See also ==
- Other United Nations General Assembly Resolutions with the prefix ES-10
- United Nations Security Council Resolution 2712
