= 13 April 1989 Nahalin raid =

1989 Israeli operation

On 13 April 1989, during the First Intifada, the Israel Border Police carried out a pre-dawn raid on the Palestinian village of Nahalin in the West Bank. During the raid, five Palestinian youth were shot and killed by the Border Police after throwing stones at the soldiers. The raid sparked protests throughout Palestine and significant controversy internationally.

== Events ==
=== Nahalin raid ===
At around 3:30 in the morning of 13 April 1989, 30 soldiers of the Israel Border Police deployed to the Palestinian village of Nahalin, near Bethlehem in the West Bank, to carry out a surprise raid on the village. The raid was principally intended to collect information on and arrest youth who threw stones at the cars of Israeli settlers passing near the village, as well as to remove nationalist graffiti and illegally raised Palestinian flags. Upon arrival in the village, the Border Police ordered village residents via loudspeaker to wake up and leave their houses so that soldiers could search the houses. As the raid fell during Ramadan, however, many of the village residents were already awake to eat suhur before beginning their fasts.

Several already awake village youth responded to the presence of the Border Police by throwing stones at the soldiers. As the soldiers continued searching the village, more youth gathered to throw stones at them. The soldiers subsequently attempted to impose a curfew on the village, ordering all residents to return and be confined to their homes. When some of the youth refused to follow the order, the soldiers opened fire using live ammunition. According to Gil Sedan of the Jewish Telegraphic Agency: "Reporters who managed to enter Nahalin, despite the curfew imposed by the army, reported that the village looked like the aftermath of a war battle: The streets were strewn with rocks and bloodstains covered the area outside the mosque, apparently the site of the clash between the youths and the security forces." Five of the villagers were killed, and at least 30 injured. Three Border Police soldiers were slightly injured by stones.

=== Protests ===
The raid and the deaths sparked protests among Palestinians. General strikes were held in eleven Palestinian municipalities the day after the raid. At some of the protests, Israeli forces used live ammunition to disperse demonstrations, injuring at least seven in the Askar Camp and at least five in Gaza City. The Israel Police deployed 3000 police officers to the Al-Aqsa Mosque and increased the number of roadblocks in Palestine that day to ensure that no unrest broke out during friday prayers, with the number of worshippers dropping from 20 000 the previous week to 7000. The Israeli military also imposed a temporary curfew on 700 000 Palestinian residents of the Palestinian territories to quell unrest and placed temporary restrictions preventing Palestinians who worked in Israel from entering Israel.

The curfew imposed on Nahalin was lifted on 17 April.

=== Inquiry ===
Israeli General Amram Mitzna held a special press conference later on the day of raid to brief the press on the raid. In the briefing, Mitzna stated that "The company was violently attacked by youths from the village, and they responded. They fired tear gas and rubber bullets and, when their lives were in danger, live ammunition." Mitzna further described Nahalin as a "troublesome" village, accusing it of being a hotspot of Islamist extremism. He however announced that the Israeli military would be opening an inquiry into the raid. The inquiry committee was composed of an Israel Defense Forces (IDF) general, an IDF colonel, and a Border Police commander.

The inquiry report was released in early May 1989. The report found that the raid had been poorly planned, that there had been scuffling between the Border Police soldiers and a unit of IDF soldiers who had hurriedly deployed to stop the shooting, and there was an "excessive use of gunfire" by the Border Police, violating Israeli military guidelines. The report recommended that the officer in charge of the raid be suspended from his position.

== Reactions ==
=== In Palestine ===
64-year-old Nahalin villager Muhammed Ibrahim Achmed, who was injured during the raid, was quoted by The New York Times as saying that the Border Police "were dealing with us as if it were a war." The New York Times also quoted 15-year-old girl Iatmeh Achmed as accusing the Border Police of having been harassing villagers in the days preceding the raid, saying that "For a week the soldiers were saying a lot of bad things, so finally the shebab couldn't take it anymore."

Palestinian Ambassador to the United Nations Zuhdi Labib Terzi claimed that the Israeli government was "solely responsible for such criminal acts against our people under occupation," calling for the United Nations Security Council to "assume its responsibility to provide physical protection for our people."

=== In Israel ===
In a radio interview, Chief of the General Staff Dan Shomron blamed the deaths on the youth who had thrown stones, saying that "those killed there, and also the casualties sustained by the Border Police, are first and foremost the result of real violence, which was used against the Border Police."

=== Internationally ===
Spokesperson for the United States Department of State Margaret D. Tutwiler called for "all sides to refrain from engaging in confrontations that lead to the unnecessary loss of life," describing the deaths as "tragic."

The United Nations General Assembly voted 129 to 2 in favour of condemning the Israeli government over the raid, with only the United States and Israel voting against the motion. Permanent Representative of Israel to the United Nations Yohanan Bein described the vote as "pointless and unproductive," arguing that "the General Assembly sees fit to convene and discuss an incident whose basic facts remain unclear, while 10,000 Syrian shells rain down daily on Beirut." Permanent Representative of Australia to the United Nations Peter Wilenski stated that the raid came "after many months of proven incidents of violence against Palestinian civilians since the start of the intifada," saying that the Australian government "could not condone the arbitrary measures being used by Israel to contain the unrest, and in particular such practices as the use of live ammunition against Palestinian demonstrators."

Human Rights Watch accused the Border Police of "indiscriminate gunfire," noting that "Israel's courts treat settlers who use force illegally far more leniently than Palestinians who are convicted of throwing stones or other acts of violence." The International Committee of the Red Cross accused the Border Police of having opened fire "without discrimination and without restraint," adding that "evacuation of the injured has been hampered, as well as the work of medical staff and hospitals in the occupied territories."

== Aftermath ==
In late May 1989, Israeli NGO Peace Now organised an event where 2000 Israelis met with residents of four Palestinian villages in the West Bank to promote peace and dialogue. One of the villages was Nahalin, including Peace Now representatives meeting with the families of the five villagers who had been killed in the raid.

== See also ==
- Israeli war crimes
