= Terra Sancta College =

Terra Sancta College and Terra Santa College may refer to

- St John Paul II Catholic College – Catholic school campus in Sydney, Australia; founded in 1996 as Terra Sancta College
- Terra Sancta College (Jerusalem) – Catholic institution, former school, called Terra Santa College in the interwar period
- Terra Santa College – School in Nicosia, oldest one in Cyprus

== See also ==
- Custody of the Holy Land, Latin: Custodia Terræ Sanctæ
