= Palestine–Uzbekistan relations =

- Palestine: Uzbekistan

Palestine–Uzbekistan relations are the relations between Palestine and Uzbekistan.

On 25 September 1994, Uzbekistan recognized and established diplomatic relations with Palestine. On 27 October 2009, Palestine's Foreign Affairs Minister Riyad al-Maliki opened the nation's embassy in Tashkent.

On 29 September 2012, Uzbekistan voted in favor of Palestine's admission to the United Nations as an Observer State.

== Reaction to the Gaza war ==
On 2 November 2023, following the outbreak of the Gaza war, Shavkat Mirziyoyev announced 1.5 million dollars in aid to UNRWA paired with a statement expressing sympathy for civilian casualties on both sides, support for the establishment of a Palestinian state, and hope for a ceasefire. This statement followed a demonstration in Tashkent on October 29 that resulted in the detention of 100 protesters, with three receiving the maximum 15 days in jail for engaging in an unsanctioned rally. On 3 November 2023 at a meeting of the Organization of Turkic States summit Mirziyoyev called for the establishment of "two states for two people" based on the United Nations Partition Plan for Palestine and pushed for this to be the official position of the OTS.

On 10 May 2024 Uzbekistan voted in favor of United Nations General Assembly Resolution ES-10/23 which grants Palestine greater rights during general assemblies within its capacity as an Observer State.

On 11 November 2024, Shavkat Mirziyoyev attended the Arab-Islamic summit in Riyadh. At this summit reaffirmed his support for the establishment of a Palestinian state in line with the borders prior to the 1967 Arab-Israeli conflict with East Jerusalem as its capital. He expressed support for the actions of the Global Alliance for the Implementation of the Two-State Solution. In this same speech, he offered free medical care to displaced Palestinian women and children.
