= United Nations General Assembly Resolution ES-10/19 =

UN General Assembly Resolution ES‑10/19
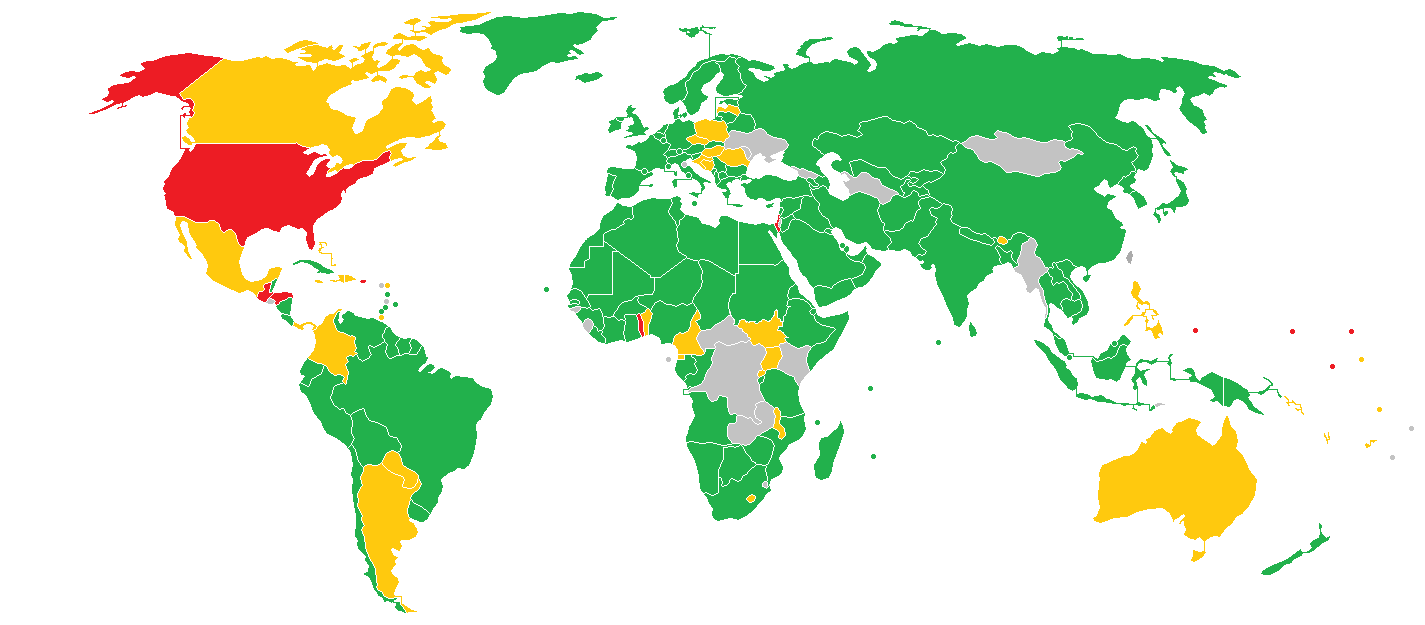
- Voted in favor Voted against Abstained Not present
- Date: 21 December 2017
- Meeting no.: 10th Emergency Special Session (continuation)
- Code: A/RES/ES-10/19 (Document)
- Subject: Status of Jerusalem
- Voting summary: 128 voted for; 9 voted against; 35 abstained; 21 absent
- Result: Resolution adopted

United Nations General Assembly Resolution ES‑10/19 is an emergency session resolution declaring the status of Jerusalem as Israel's capital as "null and void". It was adopted by the 37th Plenary meeting of the tenth emergency special session of the United Nations General Assembly during the tenure of the seventy-second session of the United Nations General Assembly on 21 December 2017. The resolution was drafted by Yemen and Turkey. Though strongly contested by the United States, it passed by 128 votes to 9 against with 21 absentees and 35 abstentions.

== Background ==
On 6 December 2017, US President Donald Trump said that he would recognise Jerusalem as Israel's capital and begin the process of moving the embassy from Tel Aviv to Jerusalem. This was a departure from previous Security Council resolutions and prevailing international norms (where no state either recognises Jerusalem as a national capital nor has an embassy there).

After a United Nations Security Council resolution was vetoed by the U.S. three days earlier, Palestinian UN Ambassador Riyad Mansour said that the General Assembly would vote on a draft resolution calling for Trump's declaration to be withdrawn. He sought to invoke Resolution 377, known as the "Uniting for Peace" resolution, to circumvent a veto. The resolution states that the General Assembly can call an Emergency Special Session to consider a matter "with a view to making appropriate recommendations to members for collective measures" if the Security Council fails to act.

== Campaign ==
On 20 December, US President Donald Trump threatened to cut US aid to countries voting against the US's side. The day before the vote, he said: "Let them vote against us...We don't care...this isn't like it used to be where they could vote against you and then you pay them hundreds of millions of dollars. We're not going to be taken advantage of any longer." Ambassador Nikki Haley warned her country would remember and "take names" of every country that voted in favour of the resolution. The governments of Turkey and Iran denounced the threats made by the US as "anti-democratic" and "blackmail". Haley had sent a letter to dozens of member states that warned Trump had asked her to "report back on those countries who voted against us." Turkish President Recep Tayyip Erdoğan said "I call on the whole world: Don't you dare sell your democratic struggle and your will for petty dollars" and warned Trump that "he cannot buy Turkey's democratic will with his dollars." He added: "I hope and expect the US won't get the result it expects from there (UN) and the world will give a very good lesson to the United States".

Israeli Prime Minister Benjamin Netanyahu stated that Israel rejects this vote before it passes and called the UN a "house of lies".

Canada's Foreign Affairs Minister Chrystia Freeland's spokesman, a country which was seeking re-negotiations of the NAFTA, confirmed its intention to abstain from the vote and that the resolution should not have come to the General Assembly.

== Content ==
The text of the resolution includes the following key statements:

The General Assembly,

- Bearing in mind the specific status of the Holy City of Jerusalem and, in particular, the need for the protection and preservation of the unique spiritual, religious and cultural dimensions of the City, as foreseen in the relevant United Nations resolutions,
- Stressing that Jerusalem is a final status issue to be resolved through negotiations in line with relevant United Nations resolutions,
- Expressing in this regard its deep regret at recent decisions concerning the status of Jerusalem,
- Affirms that any decisions and actions which purport to have altered, the character, status or demographic composition of the Holy City of Jerusalem have no legal effect, are null and void and must be rescinded in compliance with relevant resolutions of the Security Council, and in this regard, calls upon all States to refrain from the establishment of diplomatic missions in the Holy City of Jerusalem, pursuant to resolution 478 (1980) of the Security Council;
- Demands that all States comply with Security Council resolutions regarding the Holy City of Jerusalem, and not to recognize any actions or measures contrary to those resolutions;
- Reiterates its call for the reversal of the negative trends on the ground that are imperiling the two-State solution and for the intensification and acceleration of international and regional efforts and support aimed at achieving, without delay, a comprehensive, just and lasting peace in the Middle East on the basis of the relevant United Nations resolutions, the Madrid terms of reference, including the principle of land for peace, the Arab Peace Initiative and the Quartet Roadmap and an end to the Israeli occupation that began in 1967.

== Motion ==
The motion was proposed by Yemen and Turkey.

=== Debate ===
In introducing the resolution as chair of the Arab Group, Yemen's Ambassador said the US decision was a "blatant violation of the rights of the Palestinian people, as well as those of all Christians and Muslims." He emphasized that it constituted a "dangerous breach of the Charter of the United Nations and a serious threat to international peace and security, while also undermining the chances for a two‑State solution and fuelling the fires of violence and extremism."

Turkey, who was the co-sponsor of the draft resolution, also spoke as current chair of the Organization of Islamic Cooperation (OIC). Foreign Minister Mevlüt Çavuşoğlu said that Trump's decision was an outrageous assault to all universal values. "The Palestinians have the right to their own state based on 1967 borders with East Jerusalem as its capital. This is the main parameter and only hope for a just and lasting peace in the region. However, the recent decision of a UN Member State to recognise Jerusalem, or Al-Quds, as the capital of Israel, violates international law, including all relevant UN resolutions."

The General Assembly heard from Palestinian Foreign Minister Riyad al-Maliki, who said that the meeting was "not because of any animosity to the United States of America" but instead the sessions was "called to make the voice of the vast majority of the international community — and that of people around the world — heard on the question of Jerusalem/Al‑Quds Al‑Sharif." He called the US decision to recognise Jerusalem as Israel's capital and to move its embassy there "an aggressive and dangerous move" which could inflame tensions and lead to a religious war that "has no boundaries." He added that though the decision would have no impact on the city's status, it would nevertheless compromise the role of the United States in the Middle East peace process. He urged member states to reject "blackmail and intimidation."

US Ambassador Nikki Haley then said that her country was "singled out for attack" because of its recognition of Jerusalem as the capital of Israel. She added that: "The United States will remember this day in which it was singled out for attack in the General Assembly for the very act of exercising our right as a sovereign nation,” Haley said. "We will remember it when we are called upon to once again make the world’s largest contribution to the United Nations, and so many countries come calling on us, as they so often do, to pay even more and to use our influence for their benefit." She added that: "America will put our embassy in Jerusalem. That is what the American people want us to do, and it is the right thing to do. No vote in the United Nations will make any difference on that...this vote will make a difference in how Americans view the UN."

Israel's Ambassador Danny Danon then told the assembly that the vowed that "no General Assembly resolution will ever drive us from Jerusalem."

Venezuela's ambassador, speaking for the Non-Aligned Movement (NAM), expressed "grave concern about Israel’s ongoing violations in the Occupied Palestinian Territory, including attempts to alter the character, status and demographic composition of the City of Jerusalem. [It was] also concerned about the decision to relocate the United States embassy [and] warned that such provocative actions would further heighten tensions, with potentially far‑reaching repercussions given the extremely volatile backdrop.

Other speakers included Pakistan, Indonesia, Maldives, Syria, Bangladesh, Cuba, Iran, and China.

Malaysia's Ambassador Datuk Seri Mohammed Shahrul Ikram Yaakob said that, as a member of the OIC and NAM, "Malaysia joins the international community in expressing our deep concern and rejects the decision by the United States to recognise Jerusalem as the capital of Israel. It is also an infringement of the Palestinian people’s rights and their right to self determination." He called for a peaceful two-state solution and that Malaysia is concerned the situation will only feed into the agenda of extremists."

Other speakers included, the Democratic People's Republic of Korea and South Africa. The Permanent Observer for the Holy See, Tomasz Grysa, emphasised that Jerusalem was most sacred to the Abrahamic faiths and a symbol for millions of believers around the world who considered it their "spiritual capital." Its significance went "beyond the question of borders, a reality that should be considered a priority in every negotiation for a political solution." The Holy See, he said, called for a "peaceful resolution that would ensure respect for the sacred nature of Jerusalem and its universal value...reiterating that only international guarantee could preserve its unique character and status and provide assurance of dialogue and reconciliation for peace in the region."

After the motion was passed, more speeches continued with Estonia, who also spoke on behalf of other states. Australia's Ambassador then explained her country's government did "not support unilateral action that undermined the peace process [and] it did not believe today’s text would help to bring the parties back to the negotiating table."

Other speakers included, Paraguay, whose Ambassador said that the country would abstain because "the question of Jerusalem was a matter for the Security Council, as the primary body responsible for the maintenance of international peace and security." This was followed by El Salvador, Argentina and Romania.

Canada's Ambassador Marc-Andre Blanchard called the proposal "one-sided" and said: "We are disappointed that this resolution is one sided and does not advance prospects for peace to which we aspire, which is why we have abstained on today’s vote." He, however, added that Canada wanted to emphasise Jerusalem's special significance to the Abrahamic religions of Jews, Muslims and Christians. "Denying the connection between Jerusalem and the Jewish, Muslim and Christian faiths undermines the integrity of the site for all. We also reiterate the need to maintain the status quo at Jerusalem’s Holy sites.

Nicaragua explained its support of the resolution, as it "rebuffed recent unilateral attempts to modify the character and status of Jerusalem. Such unilateral actions were in blatant violation of resolution 2234 (2016) and others...unilateral actions jeopardised peace and stability in the Middle East and drew the international community further away from a solution."

Mexico's ambassador then explained the abstention and emphasised that convening an emergency session was a disproportionate response. "The United States must become part of the solution, not a stumbling block that would hamper progress...the international community was further than ever from agreement."

The Czech Republic then said that while it supported the European Union position, it had abstained because it "did not believe the draft resolution would contribute to the peace process."

Armenia said that is position "remained unchanged. The situation should be resolved through negotiations paving the way for lasting peace and security."

Hungary echoed Armenia's stance and said it would not comment on the foreign relations of the United States.

Latvia then spoke, before Estonia re-took the floor to say it had also spoken on behalf of Albania, Lithuania and the former Yugoslav Republic of Macedonia.

=== Result ===
Vote	Quantity	States
Approve	128	Afghanistan, Albania, Algeria, Andorra, Angola, Armenia, Austria, Azerbaijan, Bahrain, Bangladesh, Barbados, Belarus, Belgium, Belize, Bolivia, Botswana, Brazil, Brunei, Bulgaria, Burkina Faso, Burundi, Cape Verde, Cambodia, Chad, Chile, China, Comoros, Republic of the Congo, Costa Rica, Cuba, Cyprus, Democratic People's Republic of (North) Korea, Denmark, Djibouti, Dominica, Ecuador, Egypt, Eritrea, Estonia, Ethiopia, Finland, France, Gabon, Gambia, Germany, Ghana, Greece, Grenada, Guinea, Guyana, Iceland, India, Indonesia, Iran, Iraq, Ireland, Italy, Ivory Coast, Japan, Jordan, Kazakhstan, Kuwait, Kyrgyzstan, Laos, Lebanon, Liberia, Libya, Liechtenstein, Lithuania, Luxembourg, Macedonia, Madagascar, Malaysia, Maldives, Mali, Malta, Mauritania, Mauritius, Monaco, Montenegro, Morocco, Mozambique, Namibia, Nepal, Netherlands, New Zealand, Nicaragua, Niger, Nigeria, Norway, Oman, Pakistan, Papua New Guinea, Peru, Portugal, Qatar, Republic of (South) Korea, Russia, Saint Vincent and the Grenadines, Saudi Arabia, Senegal, Serbia, Seychelles, Singapore, Slovakia, Slovenia, Somalia, South Africa, Spain, Sri Lanka, Sudan, Suriname, Sweden, Switzerland, Syria, Tajikistan, Thailand, Tanzania, Tunisia, Turkey, United Arab Emirates, United Kingdom, Uruguay, Uzbekistan, Venezuela, Vietnam, Yemen and Zimbabwe.
Reject	9	Guatemala, Honduras, Israel, Marshall Islands, Micronesia, Nauru, Palau, Togo and United States.
Abstain	35	Antigua and Barbuda, Argentina, Australia, Bahamas, Benin, Bhutan, Bosnia and Herzegovina, Cameroon, Canada, Colombia, Croatia, Czech Republic, Dominican Republic, Equatorial Guinea, Fiji, Haiti, Hungary, Jamaica, Kiribati, Latvia, Lesotho, Malawi, Mexico, Panama, Paraguay, Philippines, Poland, Romania, Rwanda, Solomon Islands, South Sudan, Trinidad and Tobago, Tuvalu, Uganda and Vanuatu.
Absent	21	Central African Republic, Democratic Republic of the Congo, East Timor (Timor Leste), El Salvador, Georgia, Guinea-Bissau, Kenya, Mongolia, Myanmar, Moldova, Saint Kitts and Nevis, Saint Lucia, Samoa, San Marino, São Tomé and Príncipe, Sierra Leone, Swaziland, Tonga, Turkmenistan, Ukraine and Zambia.

== Reactions ==
States

- – UN Ambassador Nikki Haley announced that the U.S. will move its embassy to Jerusalem and "no vote in the UN will make any difference on that" and that the US was "by far the single largest contributor to the UN." She also warned that the US might also cut funding to the UN itself. During the 2018 State of the Union Address, Trump said that the countries which voted against the resolution opposed the United States' "sovereign right to make this recognition" and said he would ask Congress to pass legislation which would ensure foreign aid would "only go to America's friends, not enemies of America." (Note: Congress never ended up taking up such a measure)
- – Prime Minister Benjamin Netanyahu rejected the result shortly after it was announced in call it "preposterous," while he also thanked the states that supported "the truth" by not participating in "the theater of the absurd." He added that: "Jerusalem is our capital. Always was, always will be...But I do appreciate the fact that a growing number of countries refused to participate in this theatre of the absurd. So I appreciate that, and especially I want to again express our thanks to [US] President (Donald) Trump and Ambassador [Nikki] Haley, for their stalwart defense of Israel and their stalwart defense of the truth." Defense Minister Avigdor Liberman, reminded Israelis of the longstanding Israeli disdain for such votes. "Let us just remember that this is the same UN about which our first ambassador to the organization, Abba Eban, once said: 'If Algeria introduced a resolution declaring that the earth was flat and that Israel had flattened it, it would pass by a vote of 164 to 13 with 26 abstentions'. There is nothing new in what just happened at the UN." He also praised the US as "the moral beacon shining out of the darkness." Minister of Strategic Affairs and Public Security Gilad Erdan said: "The historic connection between Israel and Jerusalem is stronger than any vote by the 'United Nations' — nations who are united only by their fear and their refusal to recognize the simple truth that Jerusalem is the capital of Israel and the Jewish people."
- However, opposition Joint List Chairman and MK Ayman Odeh called the vote a wake-up call for Israel: "In the international arena, there still exists a large and definitive majority that believes that the Palestinian people, like all other nations, deserve a place in this world and the right to self-determination. This evening's vote by the majority of the world's nations against Trump's announcement, in spite of the pressure and threats, flies in the face of Trump's and Netanyahu's diplomatic policy and is a clear statement by the international community in support of peace and the right of the Palestinians to an independent state, whose capital is East Jerusalem."
- (Palestine) – Palestinian President Mahmoud Abbas thanked the member states who voted in support of the resolution "in spite of the pressures they faced." UN Ambassador Riyad Mansour called the vote "a massive setback" for the US.
- (Iran) – Minister of Foreign Affairs Mohammad Javad Zarif called the result a "resounding global no" to the Trump administration's "thuggish intimidation."
- (Bahrain) – Foreign Minister Khalid bin Ahmed Al Khalifa said that it was "unhelpful to pick up a fight with Trump over a side issue and urged countries to concentrate on the threat posed by "theo-fascist" Iran instead."
  - Israel's Foreign Affairs Ministry reacted in writing on Twitter that Khalifa had denounced an Arab boycott of Israel and confirmed Bahraini citizens were free to visit Israel.
  - Iran responded to this by saying that "Palestine's freedom from the clutches of Israeli occupation remains the Islamic world's highest priority" and that "despite all complex plots, manufactured crises and fictitious threats propagated by the US-Zionism axis, Palestine still is and will remain the Islamic world's number one priority until it is liberated, and no one... can distract Muslims from this serious issue."
- – Jimmy Morales, the president of Guatemala, one of the nine countries which voted against the resolution, announced on 24 December 2017 that he would follow Trump in move his country's embassy from Tel Aviv to Jerusalem.

Media

Haaretz's Noa Landau, wrote, in citing unnamed diplomatic sourced, that Israel was particularly disappointed with countries like India that have enhanced bilateral relations with it recently. "The main disappointment in Israel was with the countries that have enhanced bilateral relations in recent years, especially those that share a particularly conservative worldview with the Netanyahu government. For example, India – whose Prime Minister, Narendra Modi, visited Israel in July, a tour that was memorable mainly for the pastoral photographs of him and Netanyahu embracing and wading in the waves – voted for the resolution against Israel and the United States."

Others

At a "Solidarity to Save Jerusalem" rally organised by the Barisan Nasional government in Malaysia, one of the attendees Association of NextGen Christians of Malaysia President Joshua Hong said at the Putra Mosque: "We are here because we feel that the decision made by President Trump on announcing Jerusalem as the capital of Israel is merely a political decision. He added that the decision also hurts Christian and Arabic churches in Palestine and not just the Muslims. "To us as Christians, Jerusalem is a city of peace and after that announcement, we feel there is no more peace. I think it is not right and unjust. We believe we should continue pursuing the sustainable peace solution for Palestine and Israel, rather than just a single nation declaring it just like that." He claimed that about 50 members of the group turned up in a show of support for the Palestinian people.

== See also ==
- Other United Nations General Assembly Resolutions with the prefix ES-10
- United Nations General Assembly Resolution 43/177
- United Nations General Assembly Resolution 67/19
- List of United Nations resolutions concerning Israel
- List of United Nations resolutions concerning Palestine
- United Nations General Assembly resolution
