= Danny Danon =

Israeli politician (born 1971)

- דני דנון
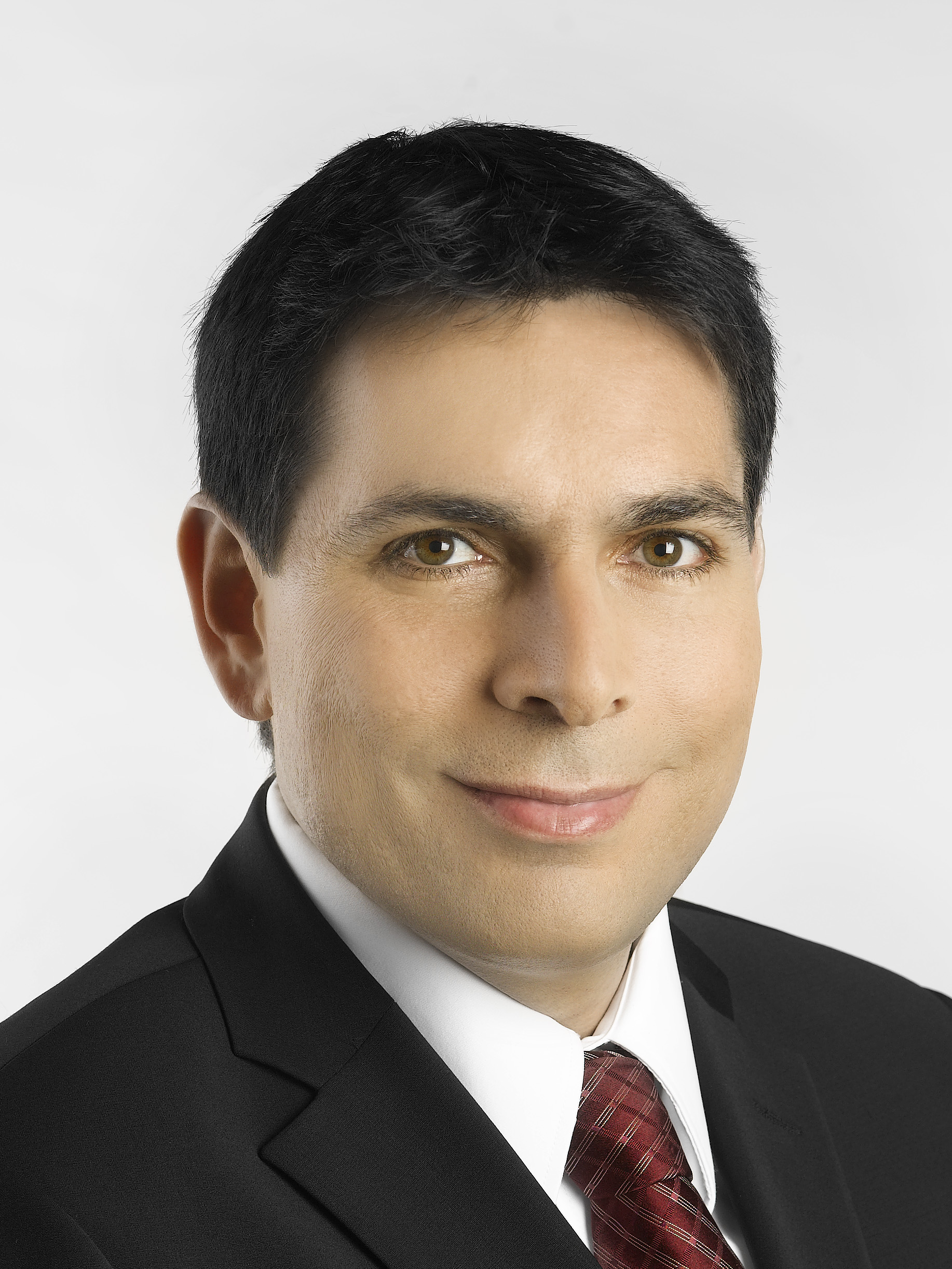
- Danon in 2008

Ministerial roles
- 2015: Minister of Science, Technology & Space

Faction represented in the Knesset
- 2009–2015: Likud
- 2022–2024: Likud

Permanent Representative of Israel to the United Nations
- Incumbent
- Assumed office 19 August 2024
- Prime Minister: Benjamin Netanyahu
- Preceded by: Gilad Erdan
- In office 14 August 2015 – 5 July 2020
- Prime Minister: Benjamin Netanyahu
- Preceded by: Ron Prosor
- Succeeded by: Gilad Erdan

Personal details
- Born: 8 May 1971 (age 55) Ramat Gan, Israel
- Children: 3
- Education: Florida International University (BA); Hebrew University of Jerusalem (MA)

Danny Danon (Hebrew: דני דנון; born 8 May 1971) is an Israeli politician and diplomat serving as Israel's Ambassador to the United Nations since 2024, and previously from 2015 to 2020. A member of the Likud party, he served in the Knesset from 2009 to 2015 and from 2022 to 2024. The former leader of the world Betar organization, Danon was elected Chairman of the World Likud. Considered a "right-wing thorn in Netanyahu's side", Danon challenged Benjamin Netanyahu for the party's leadership in 2007 and 2014.

First elected to the Knesset in the 2009 election, Danon served as Deputy Minister of Defense, which coincided with the outbreak of the 2014 Israel–Gaza conflict. He was ultimately fired by Netanyahu for criticizing the Prime Minister's willingness to accept a proposed ceasefire. In 2015, Danon was appointed to serve as Minister of Science, Technology and Space.

Danon became Israel's Permanent Representative to the United Nations in 2015, and made history in 2016 by being the first Israeli elected chair of the UN's Legal Committee. In this capacity, Danon supported the United States' recognition of Jerusalem as capital of Israel in 2017, and criticized supporters of UN General Assembly Resolution ES-10/19 as "puppets pulled by the strings of the Palestinian puppet masters." Danon left the position in 2020, and was replaced by Gilad Erdan.

Following his tenure at the UN, Danon re-entered Israeli politics, and was elected to the Knesset in the 2022 election. In a 2021 interview, Danon indicated that he would be interested in pursuing leadership of the Likud party in the future. In August 2024, Danon returned as Israel's Permanent Representative to the United Nations.

== Early life and education ==
Danon was born in Ramat Gan to Joseph and Yoheved Danon. His father, Joseph Danon, was born in Egypt, and moved to Israel in 1950. Joseph was severely wounded by shrapnel in the Jordan Valley during the War of Attrition. This caused him to enter a coma and after recovering suffered brain damage and was permanently deaf for the remainder of his life. Despite this Danon maintained a close bond with his father and would often advocate for him when his father's disability prevented him from doing so himself. Danon attended Blich High School and was a member of the Betar youth movement.

In 1989, he was drafted into the army and completed his officer's course with distinction. He served as an officer in the Education Corps and was released with the rank of captain. In his final military posting, he served as an officer in the Marva unit, a military program for Jews from around the world to strengthen ties to Israel.

He earned a bachelor's degree in international affairs from the Florida International University, and a master's degree in public policy from the Hebrew University of Jerusalem. After his national service in the IDF between 1989 and 1993, Danon was sent to Miami by the Jewish Agency. When Danon was 23, his father died from complications related to his injuries.

== Early political career ==
Danon's time as an emissary for the Jewish Agency had a big impact on his life; it was the first stepping stone in his choice to enter public service. Upon his return to Israel, Danon served as an adviser to the Chair of the Knesset Foreign affairs and Defense Committee, MK Uzi Landau.

When he was 28 years old, Danon was elected Chair of the World Betar Movement. His responsibilities included managing the administrative, financial, and educational aspects of the organization in Israel and abroad, and encouraging aliyah.

From 2004 to 2009, Danon served as the chairman of the Likud faction in the World Zionist Organization. His responsibilities included encouraging aliyah to Israel and combating antisemitism. Danon also served on the board of directors of the Jewish Agency, establishing policy, goals and monitoring the work of the Agency.

In the run-up to the 2006 legislative election, Danon was the 23rd spot on Likud's list in the party primaries. However, the party won only 12 seats in the general election, and Danon did not enter the Knesset.

In June 2006, Danon was elected chairman of the World Likud organization, defeating Yuval Steinitz MK for the position. During this period, Danon was active against Prime Minister Ariel Sharon's disengagement plan during the referendum conducted by the latter in the Likud party's central committee.

=== 2007 leadership campaign and aftermath ===
In July 2007, Danon, described as one of Benjamin Netanyahu's biggest critics from within the Likud, declared his candidacy for the party's leadership. He eventually finished third in a primary election held that August.

In 2008, Danon filed a petition to the Israeli High Court of Justice to rescind the citizenship of former MK Azmi Bishara, who fled Israel after he was suspected of aiding Hezbollah, an enemy organization of Israel, during the 2006 Lebanon War. The petition was rejected.

== First tenure in the Knesset (2009–2015) ==
=== 18th Knesset ===
On 8 December 2008, Danon was elected to the twenty-fourth place on the Likud slate for the upcoming election. In the 2009 election, the Likud party won 27 seats, and Danon was sworn in as a Member of the Knesset.

During this term, MK Danon served as Deputy Speaker of the Knesset, Chair of the Committee on the Rights of the Child, and Chair of the Committee for Immigration, Absorption and Diaspora Affairs. These positions presented Danon with the opportunities to promote legislation in a variety of fields. In addition to the committees that he chaired, Danon was also a member of the Foreign Affairs and Defense Committee, the Finance Committee, the Education, Culture and Sports Committee, the Constitution, Law and Justice Committee and the Committee on the Status of Women and Gender Equality.

Legislation that Danon promoted included laws granting widows (including those who remarried) of fallen Israeli security personnel and terror attack victims the rights to receive grants from the government. He also promoted a law in which ensured that pardoned convicts who committed a crime during their parole period would automatically be re-imprisoned. In addition, Danon passed a law that limited the promotion and advertisement of alcoholic beverages, and a law that set minimum weight requirements for the modeling industry and required advertisers to disclose whether Photoshop was used in their ads.

In an August 2011 interview with Teymoor Nabili on Al Jazeera English, Danon said "There is place only for one state on the land of Israel.... I do not believe in a two-state solution."

=== Member of the 19th Knesset – Deputy Minister of Defense ===
Danon was chosen for the fifth placement on the Likud list for the 2013 Israeli legislative election, which determined the composition of the 19th Knesset. He was reelected and went on to be appointed Deputy Minister of Defense.

During his term, Danon focused on increasing enlistment to the IDF from the Christian, and the Ultra-Orthodox and Ethiopian Jewish communities, bettering the service conditions of reservists, establishing criteria for financial benefits for the security forces, and decreasing the number of military drop-outs. In June 2013, Danon was elected Chair of the Likud Party Central Committee, with 85% of the votes.

==== Removal as Deputy Minister and 2014 leadership election ====
On 15 July 2014, Danon was dismissed as Deputy Minister of Defense position by Prime Minister Netanyahu after publicly criticizing his conduct and his willingness to accept a truce with Hamas during the 2014 Gaza War.

Danon submitted his candidacy for the 2014 Likud leadership election on 8 December 2014. Upon announcing his leadership candidacy, Danon stated that "In the past few years, the Likud movement has gone astray." Danon was the only candidate to run against Netanyahu in the election, and received 19% of the vote versus the incumbent.

=== Member of the 20th Knesset – Minister of Science, Technology and Space ===
In December 2014, Danon placed 9th in the Likud's internal primary for the 2015 legislative election. After Likud won the 2015 election, Danon was appointed Minister of Science, Technology and Space in Netanyahu's new government.

One of the first decisions Danon made after his appointment as Minister of Science, Technology and Space, was to designate the upcoming year as the year of Pioneering Women in Science and Technology. Danon also led efforts to increase awareness for science, technology and space among the residents of developing cities in Israel, by increasing the number of science-focused summer camps. Danon led negotiations with the Ministry of Finance and succeeded in increasing his Ministry's budget by 20%.

During his time in office, Danon dealt with strengthening ties and cooperation between countries and companies around the world. In June 2015, he signed a cooperation agreement with Lockheed Martin on promoting science, technology and space among children. He also visited the Sesame Particle Accelerator in Jordan, which Israel is participating in, to broaden the cooperation between the two states.

Danon served in this position until 27 August 2015, when Prime Minister Netanyahu appointed him as Ambassador and Permanent Representative to the UN.

=== Legislative accomplishments ===
During his tenure in the Knesset, Danon initiated the enactment of the following laws:

- "Weight Limitation Law" (with MK Rachel Adato): To protect models working in the modeling industry, the law states that underweight models (those with a BMI under 18.5) are not allowed to appear in advertisements within Israel. In addition, if graphic editing software is used to control the size of the model, the advertiser will be required to add a caption that takes up at least 7% of the advertisement space to reference this graphical adjustment.
- "Limitations of Marketing Alcoholic Beverages": This law prohibits any advertisement of alcoholic beverages on materials such as billboards and printed items that are intended to be viewed by minors (below the age of 18). In addition, alcoholic beverages should not be offered as prizes in television or radio programs for minors and minors are forbidden to be involved in any form of advertising for intoxicants.
- Amendment to the "Youth Working Law" (with MK Aryeh Eldad), which prohibits the employment of children in blatant advertising.
- Amendment to the "National Health Insurance Law" (with MK Ze'ev Bielski), which expanded the level of government funding for medical treatment eligibility to children on the autistic spectrum.
- Amendment to the "Weapon's Law," which lowers the age needed to enter and use a shooting range.

== First term as Permanent Representative to the UN ==
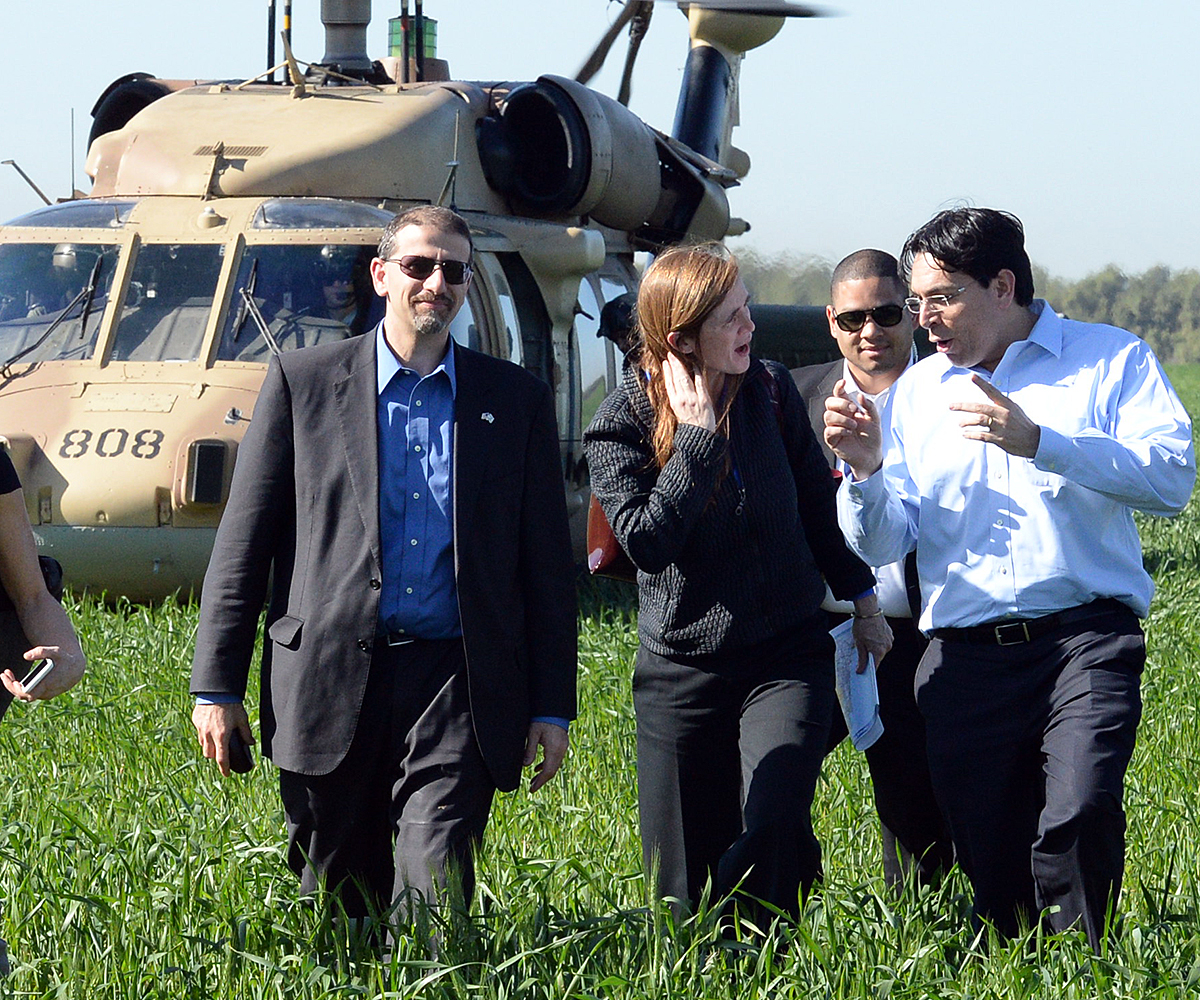
Danon and Samantha Power near the Gaza Strip in Israel, February 2016

On 14 August 2015, Danon was appointed by Netanyahu to be Israel's envoy to the UN, replacing Ron Prosor. He stepped down as a Knesset member and minister later in the month. Danny Danon became Israel's Ambassador and Permanent Representative to the UN in October 2015. At that time a wave of terrorist attack struck Israel, and the situation in Israel made its way to UN discussions. Danon's first speech took place at the Security Council's meeting on the Situation in the Middle East. The Palestinian representative to the UN, Riyad Mansour, interrupted Danon's speech, violating protocol. In a Security Council meeting on the same issue in April 2015, Danon accused the Palestinian representative for failing to condemn terror.

Ambassador Danon has visited Israel with the Secretary General, Ban Ki-moon, where they visited Israelis wounded in the recent wave of terror attacks, and met with the wife of late Richard Lakin, who was brutally stabbed in a terror attack in the capital's Armon Hanatziv neighborhood. Danon visited Israel again with US Ambassador to the UN, Samantha Power, where they toured Israel by helicopter and were briefed on the security challenges Israel faces.

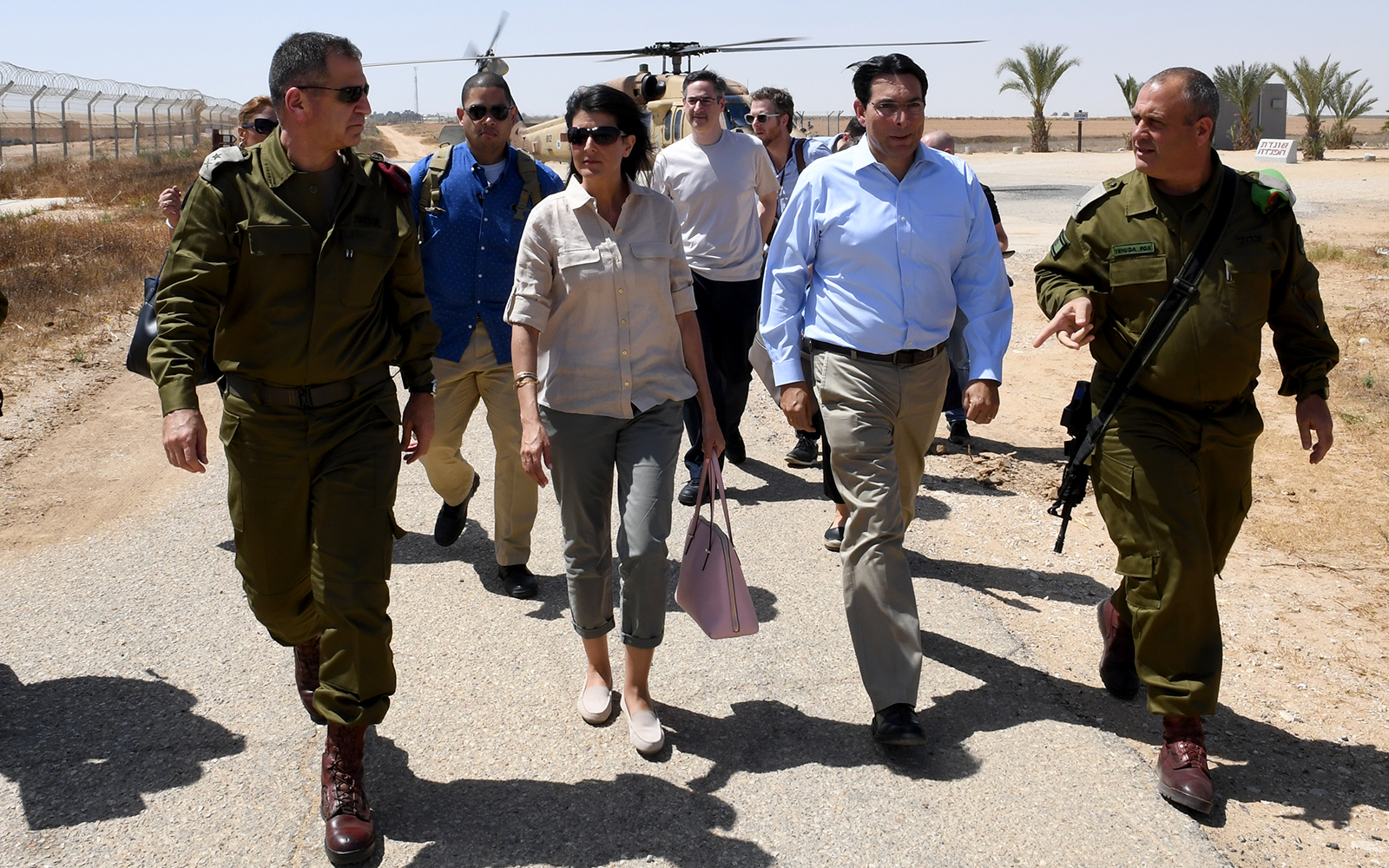
Danon with Nikki Haley at the Kerem Shalom border crossing in June 2017

During Danon's term as Permanent Representative, the Israeli Mission marked several notable achievements including: Recognition of Yom Kippur as an Official UN holiday, Acceptance to the Committee on the Peaceful Uses of Outer Space (COPUOS), ZAKA and Access Israel, both Israeli NGOs, received consultative status at the UN, an Israeli UN resolution on Agricultural Technologies for Sustainable Development was adopted by the UN General Assembly, US Secretary of State John Kerry attended an event marking 40 years since Chaim Herzog's historic UN speech, Israel held the first ever international summit at the UN against BDS, and Ambassador Danon became the first ever Israeli representative to chair a main UN committee. The Israeli Mission also held an event in remembrance of the Jews that were persecuted in Arab countries.

His time as envoy to the UN is also characterized by a strong push against the UN's historically negative treatment of Israel. After eight months elapsed in which the UN refused to condemn the wave of terror in Israel, including a statement by UN Secretary General Ban Ki-moon that it is “Human Nature to react to occupation,” On 9 June, both the Secretary General and the Security Council condemned terror in Israel for the first time following the Attack in the Sarona Market in Tel Aviv. In addition, the Israeli Mission partnered with "Stand With Us" to display an exhibit about Israel, which was partially censored for its panels about Jerusalem and Zionism, was later displayed fully following pressure and diplomatic efforts by Ambassador Danon.

In 2016, Danon led a delegation of 14 ambassadors from the UN to Israel. Days later, the Security Council adopted resolution 2334, which noted that Israeli settlements in the West Bank, including in Jerusalem, are a violation of international law and an obstacle to peace. Despite Israel anticipating the Obama administration to use its veto, the resolution passed. In June 2016, Danon was elected as chairman of the U.N. Legal Committee, making him the first Israeli chosen to head a permanent committee of the U.N.

On 31 May 2017, Danon was elected as Vice President of the General Assembly as the representative of the Western European and Others (WEOG) group.

Danon strongly condemned the UN's repeated denunciations of Israel at the UN. A noteworthy instance is in his speech in response to UN Resolution 2334 which denounced Israeli construction in Jerusalem. Danon likewise delivered a speech to the UN General Assembly in December 2017 in response to criticism of a decision by the US to move its embassy to Jerusalem.

Danon slammed supporters of General Assembly Resolution ES-10/19, which declared the status of Jerusalem as Israel's capital "null and void." In a speech, he referred to supporters of the resolution as "puppets pulled by the strings of the Palestinian puppet masters," comparing them to "marionettes forced to dance while the Palestinian leadership looks on with glee."

== Second tenure in the Knesset (2022–2024) ==
On 29 June 2022, ahead of an upcoming legislative election, Danon announced his intention to run for a spot on the Likud's electoral list, and won the 15th spot in a party primary held that August. He unsuccessfully stood for the position of Speaker of the Knesset.

Described as a "Likud heavyweight" by The Jerusalem Post, he indicated in a 2021 interview that he would be interested in pursuing leadership of Likud in the future. As a member of the Knesset, Danon called for the "sever[ing] of all ties" with UN Secretary General António Guterres.

In a 9 November 2023 post on X during the Gaza war, Danon announced that Israel's internal security agency would add photojournalists who recorded the October 7 attacks to a list of targets for elimination.

== Second term as Permanent Representative to the UN ==
On 29 July 2024, Danon was chosen to succeed Gilad Erdan as Permanent Representative of Israel to the United Nations. He subsequently resigned from the Knesset. He presented his credentials to the Secretary-General of the United Nations, António Guterres, on 19 August 2024.

== Political views ==
=== West Bank ===
In 2013, Danon asserted that the Likud party has no place for anyone supporting a peace agreement with the Palestinians. He is opposed to a two-state solution. He argues for extending Israeli sovereignty over the majority of the West Bank.

Two years prior, in May 2011, Danon advocated that Israel annex all West Bank settlements and "uninhabited areas". He concluded that Israel would bear no responsibility to Palestinians in the West Bank, who would live in their own "unannexed" towns and that this solution would avert the "threat to the Jewish and democratic status of Israel by a growing Palestinian population."

=== Gaza Strip ===
Danon has advocated for punitive attacks against Palestinian civilians and infrastructure, including a suggestion that Israel "delete" one neighborhood in Gaza in response for every rocket launched by Hamas.

In July 2014, Danon advocated cutting off all electricity and fuel supplies to Gaza to induce Hamas to request a cease-fire. Subsequently, on 1 August 2014, after the kidnapping of an Israeli soldier, Danon was quoted as saying "If we don't get the soldier back within a few hours we should start levelling Gaza."

In November 2023, during the Gaza war, he suggested moving Palestinians from Gaza to countries that would be willing to accept them. Israel's far-right minister Bezalel Smotrich praised his proposal, writing: "I welcome the initiative of members of Knesset Ram Ben-Barak and Danny Danon on the voluntary immigration of Gaza Arabs to the countries of the world. This is the right humanitarian solution for the residents of Gaza and the entire region."

=== Immigration from Africa ===
Danon is an opponent of immigration from Africa, and in 2011 said that the "arrival of thousands of Muslim infiltrators to Israeli territory is a clear threat to the state's Jewish identity." Danon asked then-Australian MP Michael Danby if it would be possible to transfer African migrants in Israel to Australia.

== Writing ==
Danon published his first book in September 2012, titled Israel: the Will to Prevail. The book analyzes the Israel–US relationship and presents alternative approaches to the conventional wisdom on negotiating peace between Israelis and Palestinians. It also criticizes President Obama's approach to Israel. In 2022, Danon released a second book titled In the Lion's Den: Israel and the World, describing his first term as Israel's Permanent Representative to the UN.
