= United Nations General Assembly Resolution ES-10 =

United Nations General Assembly Resolution ES-10 can refer to any one of the following resolutions adopted during the tenth emergency special session of the United Nations General Assembly:

- United Nations General Assembly Resolution ES-10/18, adopted 16 January 2009 regarding Israeli settlements in the Occupied Palestinian Territories and the Golan Heights
- United Nations General Assembly Resolution ES-10/19, adopted 21 December 2017 regarding the Status of Jerusalem
- United Nations General Assembly Resolution ES-10/20, adopted 13 June 2018 regarding Israeli actions in the Occupied Palestinian Territories
- United Nations General Assembly Resolution ES-10/21, adopted 27 October 2023 regarding a ceasefire in the Gaza War
- United Nations General Assembly Resolution ES-10/22, adopted 12 December 2023, same as the 10/21 resolution, but also calls for an "immediate and unconditional" release of hostages
- United Nations General Assembly Resolution ES-10/23, adopted 10 May 2024, upgrades Palestine's membership status to "Observer State"
