= Nasser al-Qudwa =

Palestinian diplomat

Nasser Al Qudwa ناصر القدوة
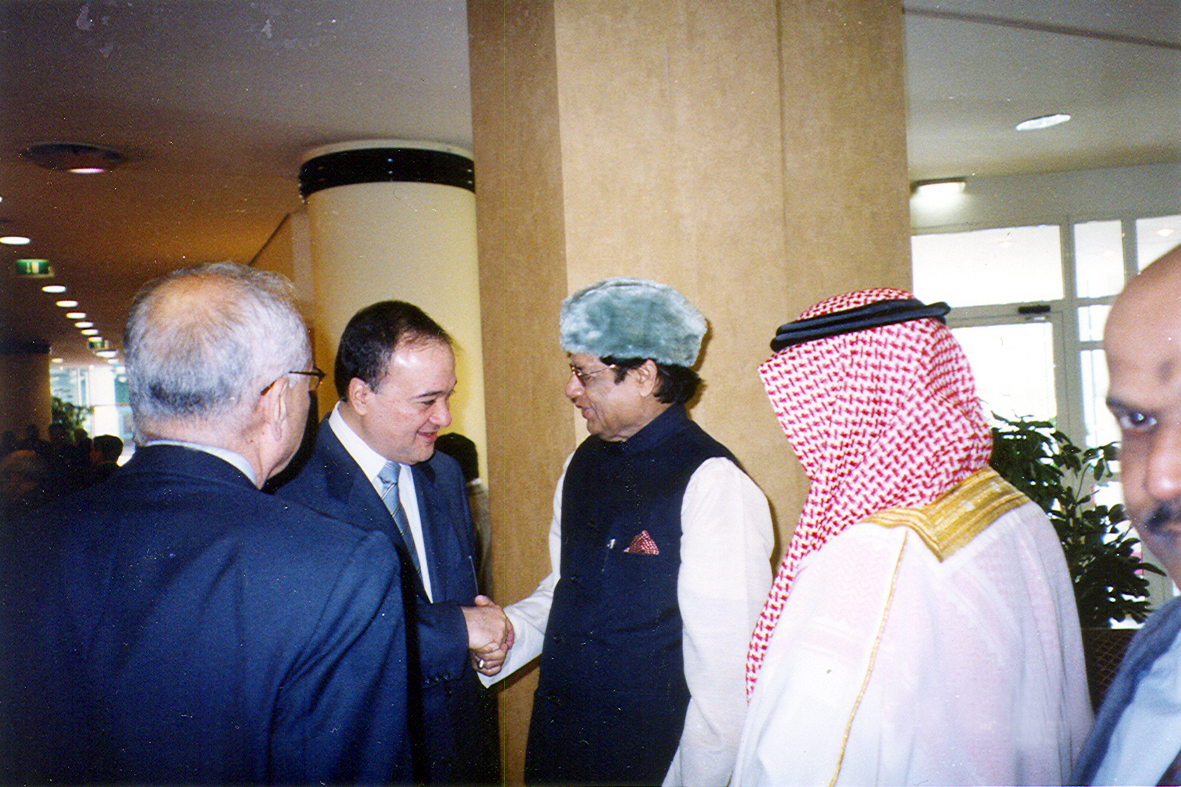
- Al Qudwa in 2005

Minister of Foreign Affairs
- In office 24 February 2005 – 29 March 2006
- Prime Minister: Ahmed Qurei
- Preceded by: Nabil Shaath
- Succeeded by: Mahmoud al-Zahar

2nd Palestinian Ambassador to the United Nations
- In office 1991–2005
- President: Yasser Arafat; Rawhi Fattouh (acting); Mahmoud Abbas
- Preceded by: Zuhdi Labib Terzi
- Succeeded by: Riyad Mansour

Personal details
- Born: 16 April 1953 (age 73) Gaza City, Palestine
- Party: Fatah
- Relatives: Yasser Arafat (uncle)
- Education: Cairo University; Doctor of Dental Medicine and Surgery

Nasser Al Qudwa, also spelled Nasser Al-Kidwa, (Arabic: ناصر القدوة; born 16 April 1953) is a Palestinian politician. A long-time activist in Fatah, he represented the Palestine Liberation Organization at the United Nations from 1991 to 2005, when he became the Minister of Foreign Affairs of the Palestinian Authority. Al Qudwa served in that role until 2006.

== Early life and education ==
Al Qudwa was born in 1953. He attended Cairo University, graduating with a degree in dentistry in 1979. Then became an executive member of the Palestinian Red Crescent shortly after.

== Career ==
Al Qudwa joined Fatah in 1969. He became president of the General Union of Palestinian Students in 1974. He is also a central-committee member of Fatah.

Qudwa represented his uncle Yasser Arafat and the Palestine Liberation Organization as an unofficial observer in the United Nations in 1987, then as a permanent observer in 1991. In 2005, he was succeeded by Riyad H. Mansour, when he became Foreign Affairs Minister in the Palestinian Authority Government of February 2005. Nasser served as United Nations Deputy Special Representative of the Secretary-General for Afghanistan in the United Nations Assistance Mission in Afghanistan (UNAMA). Al Qudwa was appointed deputy to Kofi Annan, then special envoy to Syria for the United Nations and Arab League in March 2012. He was responsible for the contacts with Syrian opposition groups. In 2014, Al Qudwa resigned from his position as UN Deputy Mediator on Syria.

On 21 March 2021, the Fatah Central Committee dismissed Al Qudwa from the party after he announced plans to run a separate list of candidates under the National Democratic Forum bloc in the 2021–22 Palestinian local elections. He also announced plans to back Marwan Barghouthi, serving life sentences in Israeli prison, in the planned 2021 Palestinian presidential election, which was delayed indefinitely. Al Qudwa's announcement and subsequent dismissal represented fissures in Fatah, as Al Qudwa called for Fatah leaders to stand against Palestinian President Mahmoud Abbas.

== Personal life ==
Al Qudwa is the nephew of Yasser Arafat. He is the head of the Yasser Arafat Foundation.

== See also ==
- Ministry of Foreign Affairs of Palestine
- Foreign relations of Palestine

Diplomatic posts
Preceded by Zuhdi Labib Terzi	Palestinian Ambassador to the United Nations; 1991–2005	Succeeded by Riyad Mansour
Political offices
Preceded by Nabil Shaath	Minister of Foreign Affairs; 2005–2006	Succeeded by Mahmoud al-Zahar
