= Mahmoud al-Zahar =

Palestinian politician (born 1945)

- محمود الزهار
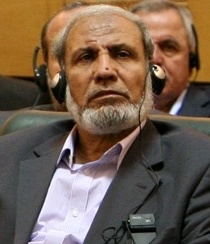
- al-Zahar in 2011

Minister of Foreign Affairs
- In office 29 March 2006 – 17 March 2007
- Prime Minister: Ismail Haniyeh
- Preceded by: Nasser al-Qudwa
- Succeeded by: Ziad Abu Amr

Member of the Palestinian Legislative Council
- Incumbent
- Assumed office 18 February 2006

Personal details
- Born: 6 May 1945 (age 81) Gaza City, Mandatory Palestine
- Party: Hamas
- Spouse: Summaya
- Children: 7
- Education: Cairo University; Ain Shams University
- Profession: Politician, physician

Mahmoud al-Zahar (Arabic: محمود الزهار, romanized: Maḥmūd az-Zahhār; born 6 May 1945) is a Palestinian politician and physician. He is a co-founder of Hamas and a member of the Hamas leadership in the Gaza Strip. Al-Zahar has served as a member of the Palestinian Legislative Council since 18 February 2006 and served as foreign affairs minister in the Hamas-dominated Palestinian Authority Government of March 2006 (also known as the First Haniyeh Government) that was sworn in on 29 March 2006 and lasted until 17 March 2007.

== Early life and education ==
Little is known about al-Zahar's early life beyond the fact that he was born in Gaza City in 1945 to a Palestinian father and an Egyptian mother.

In 1971, he graduated from the Cairo University Faculty of Medicine and five years later he got his master's degree in General Surgery from Ain Shams University, Cairo. He then became the adviser to the Palestinian Health Minister, and helped create the Palestinian Medical Society and was one of the primary founders of the Islamic University in Gaza in 1978.

== Career with Hamas ==
Al-Zahar was instrumental in the creation of Hamas in 1987. Prior to his Hamas career, he had been a surgeon and worked in Palestinian cities such as Khan Yunis, but was dismissed from this position by Israeli authorities for political reasons. He was detained by Israeli authorities in 1988, and eventually exiled to Lebanon along with a large number of other Islamist activists in 1992. He returned to Gaza after about a year. In response to a campaign of suicide bombings by the Ezzedeen al-Qassam Brigades (EQB), on 10 September 2003 an Israeli F-16 dropped a large bomb over his house in the Rimal neighborhood of Gaza, which only managed to slightly wound him, while his eldest son Khaled, and a personal bodyguard were killed.

Al-Zahar has remained a senior official and spokesperson for the group and was rumoured to have succeeded to leadership of the group following Israel's assassination of Ahmed Yassin in 2004. Hamas routinely denied this rumour, but refused to name who their new leader was, for fear of Israeli action. Al-Zahar was elected for Hamas to the Palestinian Legislative Council at the 2006 Palestinian legislative election, and continues to be a member (as no elections for the PLC have taken place since). He was foreign affairs minister in the Hamas-dominated Palestinian Authority Government of March 2006 (also known as the First Haniyeh Government) that was sworn in on 20 March 2006. Al-Zahar's main challenge was to break the United States-led diplomatic boycott of the Haniyeh government. On 14 June 2006, Palestinian officials reported that al-Zahar brought twelve suitcases stuffed with US$26.7 million in cash into Gaza through its border with Egypt.

On 15 January 2008, al-Zahar's son Hussam, a member of IQB, was reportedly killed in an IDF airstrike.

In 2010, al-Zahar revealed to the press that Yasser Arafat had instructed Hamas to launch militant attacks—including suicide bombings—against Israel in 2000, due to peace talks not going anywhere.

Al-Zahar was interviewed by Sky News following the 2021 Israel–Palestine crisis. He described the two-state solution as "a failed process" that would never be accepted by Israel and stated that the State of Israel did not have a right to exist, describing it as a "settlement". Asked about accusations that Hamas had targeted Israeli civilians, al-Zahar denied the claims, and also denied when asked that Hamas is anti-Semitic: "We are not against Jews because Jews were living this area for many centuries. I'm speaking about occupation."

During the Gaza War, the United Kingdom placed economic sanctions on al-Zahar.

=== Incitement controversy ===
During the 2008–2009 Gaza War, al-Zahar, during a television broadcast, was reported to have said that the Israelis "have legitimised the murder of their own children by killing the children of Palestine." This remark was widely reported as advocating the "murder" of Jewish children worldwide. Maajid Nawaz condemned the remarks as "depraved" and "perverse Al-Qaeda logic," writing that, as opposed to Hamas, "Israel does not have an active policy of deliberately capturing children to murder them, or even deliberately murdering civilians for that matter." Basim Naim, the minister of health in the Hamas government in Gaza, said Zahar's statements had been misquoted and mistranslated, and that what he did was to "warn that by carrying out these barbaric massacres of children and women, and by destroying our mosques, the Zionists are creating the conditions for people to believe it is justified or legitimate to take revenge....Dr Zahar did not even mention 'Jews' in his comments".

=== Park51 endorsement ===
In an interview on New York's WABC radio, al-Zahar was asked by Aaron Klein to comment on the construction of the mosque Park51 near the World Trade Center site. Al-Zahar endorsed the building.

== Personal life ==
Al-Zahar has had four children with his wife Summaya. On 10 September 2003, his eldest son Khaled was killed in an Israeli air strike. His other son, a member of Hamas's military wing, the Izz ad-Din al-Qassam Brigades, was killed by Israeli fire in Gaza on 15 January 2008.

== Books ==
- لا مستقبل بين الأمم (Lā Mustaqbal Bayna al-Umam / “No Future Among Nations”), Beirut: Arab Scientific Publishers, 2010. Type: polemical/political.
- العصف المأكول (al-ʿAsf al-Maʾkūl / “The Eaten Storm”), 2016. Type: novel/Islamic fiction.

Political offices
Preceded by Nasser al-Qudwa	Minister of Foreign Affairs; 2006–2007	Succeeded by Ziad Abu Amr
