= United Nations General Assembly Resolution ES-10/18 =

UN General Assembly Resolution ES-10/18

UN General Assembly Resolution ES-10/18
- Date: 16 January 2009
- Meeting no.: 10th Emergency Special Session (continuation)
- Code: A/RES/ES-10/18 (Document)
- Subject: Israeli settlements in the Occupied Palestinian Territory, including East Jerusalem, and in the occupied Syrian Golan (2009)
- Voting summary: 142 voted for; 3 voted against; 9 abstained
- Result: Adopted

United Nations General Assembly Resolution ES-10/18 was passed during the tenth emergency special session in response to the Gaza War (2008-2009). It aimed to enforce UN Security Council Resolution 1860, calling for an immediate ceasefire, withdrawal of Israeli forces from Gaza, and unimpeded humanitarian aid distribution. The resolution was adopted with overwhelming support (142-3) and 9 abstentions.

== Voting record ==
In favour (142)	Abstaining (9)	Against (3)	Absent (38)
Afghanistan; Albania; Algeria; Andorra; Angola; Argentina; Armenia; Austria; Azerbaijan; Bahamas; Bahrain; Bangladesh; Barbados; Belarus; Belgium; Belize; Benin; Bhutan; Bolivia (Plurinational State of); Bosnia and Herzegovina; Botswana; Brazil; Brunei Darussalam; Bulgaria; Burkina Faso; Burundi; Cambodia; Chile; China; Colombia; Comoros; Congo; Costa Rica; Croatia; Cuba; Cyprus; Czech Republic; Democratic People's Republic of Korea; Denmark; Egypt; El Salvador; Eritrea; Estonia; Ethiopia; Finland; FYROM; France; Gambia (Republic of The); Germany; Greece; Grenada; Guatemala; Guinea; Guyana; Haiti; Honduras; Hungary; Iceland; India; Iraq; Ireland; Italy; Jamaica; Japan; Jordan; Kazakhstan; Kenya; Kuwait / Lao People's Democratic Republic; Latvia; Lebanon; Lesotho; Libyan Arab Jamahiriya; Liechtenstein; Lithuania; Luxembourg; Madagascar; Malaysia; Maldives; Mali; Malta; Mauritania; Mauritius; Mexico; Monaco; Mongolia; Montenegro; Morocco; Mozambique; Myanmar; Namibia; Nepal; Netherlands; New Zealand; Nicaragua; Niger; Norway; Oman; Pakistan; Panama; Papua New Guinea; Peru; Poland; Portugal; Qatar; Republic of Korea; Republic of Moldova; Romania; Russian Federation; Saint Lucia; Saint Vincent and the Grenadines; San Marino; Saudi Arabia; Senegal; Serbia; Sierra Leone; Singapore; Slovakia; Slovenia; Solomon Islands; South Africa; Spain; Sri Lanka; Swaziland; Sweden; Switzerland; Tajikistan; Thailand; Trinidad and Tobago; Tunisia; Turkey; Uganda; Ukraine; United Arab Emirates; United Kingdom of Great Britain and Northern Ireland; United Republic of Tanzania; Uruguay; Uzbekistan; Viet Nam; Yemen; Zambia; Zimbabwe	Australia; Canada; Cote D'Ivoire; Ecuador; Indonesia; Iran (Islamic Republic of); Nigeria; Syrian Arab Republic; Venezuela (Bolivarian Republic of)	Israel; Nauru; United States of America	Antigua and Barbuda; Cape Verde; Cameroon; Central African Republic; Chad; Democratic Republic of the Congo; Djibouti; Dominica; Dominican Republic; Equatorial Guinea; Fiji; Gabon; Georgia; Ghana; Guinea-Bissau; Kiribati; Kyrgyzstan; Liberia; Malawi; Marshall Islands; Micronesia, Federated States of Palau; Paraguay; Philippines; Rwanda; Saint Kitts and Nevis; Samoa; Sao Tome and Principe; Seychelles; Somalia; Sudan; Suriname; Timor-Leste; Togo; Tonga; Turkmenistan; Tuvalu; Vanuatu
Observer States: Holy See

== See also ==
- Tenth emergency special session of the United Nations General Assembly
- Gaza War (2008-2009)
- Other United Nations General Assembly Resolutions with the prefix ES-10
- United Nations General Assembly resolution
- United Nations Security Council Resolution 1860
