= Zuhdi Labib Terzi =

Palestinian politician and diplomat

Zuhdi Labib Tarazi
- زهدي لبيب سليمان ترزي

1st Palestinian Ambassador to the United Nations
- In office 1974–1991
- President: Yasser Arafat
- Preceded by: Position established
- Succeeded by: Nasser al-Qudwa

Personal details
- Born: 20 February 1924 Jerusalem, Mandatory Palestine
- Died: 1 March 2006 (aged 82) Amman, Jordan
- Spouse: Widad Awad
- Children: Karimah Zuhdi Tarazi, Kamel Zuhdi Tarazi
- Education: Terra Santa College

Zuhdi Labib Terzi (née Zuhdi Labib Suleiman Tarazi 20 February 1924 – 1 March 2006) served as the first Palestinian Ambassador to the United Nations from 1974 to 1991.

== Ambassador to the UN ==
Terzi was the first Ambassador, Permanent Observer of Palestine to the United Nations and served from 1974 to 1991. Terzi successfully fought attempts by the United States to close down the Mission, and following the 1988 Declaration of the Independence of the State of Palestine, Terzi changed the role of the Ambassador from representing the Palestinian Liberation Organization to representing the State of Palestine.

In 1985, the United States Department of State refused Terzi the right to enter the United States for a debate with Harvard professor, Alan Dershowitz. Consequentially, Harvard Law School brought suit against the Secretary of State George P. Shultz to permit Terzi to enter the United States. Judge Skinner, of the United States District Court for the District of Massachusetts, reversed the decision of the Secretary and permitted Terzi to enter the United States because denying Terzi entry into the United States suppressed political speech that is protected under the First Amendment.

== Personal life and education ==
Tarazi, dubbed a Knight of the Holy Sepulchre by the Patriarch of Jerusalem, was born to Greek Orthodox parents in Jerusalem during the British Mandate. He attended Terra Santa College, and graduated with a law degree in 1948.

== See also ==
- Foreign Affairs Minister of the Palestinian National Authority
- Foreign relations of Palestine
