= United Nations General Assembly Resolution ES-10/21 =

UN General Assembly Resolution ES-10/21

UN General Assembly Resolution ES-10/21
- In favour Against Abstentions Absent Non member
- Date: 27 October 2023
- Meeting no.: 10th Emergency Special Session (continuation)
- Code: A/RES/ES-10/21 (Document)
- Subject: Protection of civilians and upholding legal and humanitarian obligations.
- Voting summary: 121 voted for; 14 voted against; 44 abstained
- Result: Adopted

United Nations General Assembly Resolution ES-10/21 is a resolution of the tenth emergency special session of the United Nations General Assembly relating to the Gaza war.

It called for an "immediate and sustained" humanitarian truce and cessation of hostilities, condemned "all acts of violence aimed at Palestinian and Israeli civilians" and "[d]emands that all parties immediately and fully comply with their obligations under international law".

The resolution was introduced by Jordan following four failed attempts at resolutions on humanitarian pauses and ceasefires in the U.N. Security Council. It was adopted on 27 October 2023 by a vote of 121 to 14, with 44 abstentions.

== Procedures and background ==
On October 17, 2023, a U.N. Security Council (UNSC) resolution calling for humanitarian access, safe evacuation of civilians, and release of hostages was proposed by Russia's U.N. delegation. It did not receive the required nine votes in the UNSC, only receiving four votes in favor, four votes against, and six abstaining. On October 18, a Brazilian UNSC resolution calling for a ceasefire to facilitate humanitarian aid deliveries and including an explicit condemnation of Hamas actions against Israel, was vetoed. The U.S. delegation argued that since the resolution did not "mention Israel's right of self-defense," the U.S. was vetoing it.

United Nations General Assembly Resolution ES-10/21 was introduced by Jordan on behalf of a group of Arab states following four failed attempts at resolutions on humanitarian pauses and ceasefires in the U.N. Security Council. 21 other Arab countries worked on the resolution draft. The resolution has 47 sponsoring states (shown in voting table below).

The Canadian U.N. delegation proposed an amendment to the resolution condemning Hamas. Although a majority of U.N. members supported this, the amendment fell short of the necessary two-thirds majority to be adopted, with a vote of 88 in favor, 55 against, and 23 abstentions. The proposed amendment also condemned "the taking of hostages and...demanded the safety, well-being and humane treatment of those hostages."

On October 25, United Nations Secretary-General António Guterres called for a ceasefire, during a speech in which he stated that the attacks by Hamas "did not happen in a vacuum" and needed to be understood in the context of 56 years of Israel's "suffocating occupation" of Palestinians, further stating that "the grievances of the Palestinian people cannot justify the appalling attacks by Hamas. And those appalling attacks cannot justify the collective punishment of the Palestinian people." Israel responded by saying it would ban UN representatives from Israel to "teach them a lesson", and called for the General-Secretary's resignation.

== Voting record ==
Due to a technical fault in Iraq's electronic voting equipment, the result was initially incorrectly presented as 120 in favour.

| In favour (121) 47 states sponsoring (marked †) | Abstaining (44) | Against (14) | Absent (14) |
|---|---|---|---|
| Afghanistan; Algeria; Andorra; Angola; Antigua and Barbuda; Argentina; Armenia; Azerbaijan†; Bahamas†; Bahrain†; Bangladesh†; Barbados; Belarus; Belgium; Belize†; Bhutan; Bolivia (Plurinational State of)† Bosnia and Herzegovina; Botswana†; Brazil; Brunei Darussalam†; Central African Republic; Chad†; Chile; China†; Colombia; Comoros†; Congo; Costa Rica; Cote D'Ivoire; Cuba†; Democratic People's Republic of Korea†; Democratic Republic of the Congo; Djibouti†; Dominica; Dominican Republic; Ecuador; Egypt†; El Salvador†; Equatorial Guinea; Eritrea; France; Gabon; Gambia (Republic of The)†; Ghana; Grenada; Guinea; Guinea-Bissau; Guyana; Honduras; Indonesia†; Iran (Islamic Republic of); Iraq†; Ireland; Jordan†; Kazakhstan; Kenya; Kuwait†; Kyrgyzstan; Lao People's Democratic Republic; Lebanon† / Lesotho; Libya†; Liechtenstein; Luxembourg; Madagascar; Malawi; Malaysia†; Maldives†; Mali; Malta; Mauritania†; Mauritius; Mexico; Mongolia; Montenegro; Morocco†; Mozambique; Myanmar; Namibia†; Nepal; New Zealand; Nicaragua†; Niger; Nigeria; Norway; Oman†; Pakistan†; Peru; Portugal; Qatar†; Russian Federation†; Saint Kitts and Nevis; Saint Lucia; Saint Vincent and the Grenadines†; Saudi Arabia†; Senegal†; Sierra Leone; Singapore; Slovenia; Solomon Islands; Somalia†; South Africa†; Spain; Sri Lanka; Sudan†; Suriname; Switzerland; Syrian Arab Republic; Tajikistan; Thailand; Timor-Leste†; Trinidad and Tobago; Turkey†; Uganda†; United Arab Emirates†; United Republic of Tanzania; Uzbekistan; Viet Nam; Yemen†; Zimbabwe† | Albania; Australia; Bulgaria; Cabo Verde; Cameroon; Canada; Cyprus; Denmark; Estonia; Ethiopia; Finland; Georgia; Germany; Greece; Haiti; Iceland; India; Italy; Japan; Kiribati; Latvia; Lithuania; Monaco; Netherlands; North Macedonia; Palau; Panama; Philippines; Poland; Republic of Korea; Republic of Moldova; Romania; San Marino; Serbia; Slovakia; South Sudan; Sweden; Tunisia; Tuvalu; Ukraine; United Kingdom of Great Britain and Northern Ireland; Uruguay; Vanuatu; Zambia | Austria; Croatia; Czech Republic; Fiji; Guatemala; Hungary; Israel; Marshall Islands; Micronesia, Federated States of Nauru; Papua New Guinea; Paraguay; Tonga; United States of America | Benin; Burkina Faso; Burundi; Cambodia; Eswatini (the Kingdom of); Jamaica; Liberia; Rwanda; Samoa; São Tomé and Príncipe; Seychelles; Togo; Turkmenistan; Venezuela (Bolivarian Republic of)† (Note: Venezuela was suspended from voting in the 76th session and the 11th emergency special session owing to its failure to pay dues in the previous two years, for which it did not receive a special waiver from the Assembly.) |
Observer States: Holy See and State of Palestine†

== Response ==
The Guardian reported that the US and Israel appeared isolated after only 12 countries joined them in opposing the motion, half of which were Pacific islands. The Israeli representative to the United Nations, Gilad Erdan, condemned the resolution, claiming that the UN "no longer holds even one ounce of legitimacy or relevance", while U.S. representative Linda Thomas-Greenfield blasted the resolution as "outrageous". In addition, Olof Skoog, Permanent Observer for the European Union, regretted the use of vetoes against the U.N. Security Council resolution, the representatives of State of Palestine, Turkey, Qatar, Syria, Ghana, France, Russia, Iran, and Egypt noted their support of the resolution, while Jamaican representative Brian Christopher Manley Wallace called on all parties to end the conflict, and Venezuelan representative Joaquín Alberto Pérez Ayestarán, speaking on behalf of the Group of Friends in Defense of the United Nations Charter, called on Israel to adhere to international law. In a statement explaining the reasoning behind their yes vote, the Swiss delegation noted that it condemned the Hamas attacks and was in favour of the Canadian amendment, but supported the resolution because it responded to the need of allowing humanitarian aid to people in Gaza. The U.S. delegation also called the resolution "deeply flawed." Tarek Ladeb, the Tunisian ambassador to the U.N., stated that Tunisia abstained on the resolution because it failed to denounce war crimes and genocide against Palestinians by Israeli forces.

Other responses were mixed. Eli Cohen, the Israeli Minister of Foreign Affairs, stated on Twitter that Israel "categorically reject[ed]" the resolution, and added, "Israel intends to eliminate Hamas just as the world dealt with the Nazis and ISIS." Cohen also called the resolution "repugnant" and said that Israel "firmly rejects it." The Czech Republic voted against the resolution, the country's ambassador to the U.N., Jakub Kulhánek, voting against it, arguing that the resolution did not condemn Hamas' actions, recognize Israeli right to self-defense, and did not include a "demand for the release of hostages." On social media, Czech Defense Minister Jana Černochová stated that the Czech Republic should leave the United Nations, a view which was rejected by the country's Prime Minister (Petr Fiala), Foreign Minister (Jan Lipavský) and other cabinet officials.

The Philippines abstained in the vote regarding the resolution despite supporting several points of the draft. It wanted explicit condemnation of Hamas' attack on 7 October. Australia also abstained due to the omission of Hamas in the draft as the perpetrator of the 7 October attacks.

In a statement, Hamas expressed its support for the resolution and stated that it needed to be immediately implemented. Mohd Na'im Mokhtar, religious affairs minister for Malaysia, argued that with the passage of the resolution, ceasefire can be achieved and humanitarian aid can "be given to the Palestinian people, especially in Gaza." In another statement, the Malaysian Ministry of Foreign Affairs expressed the government's support for the resolution. The Pakistani caretaker Foreign Minister, Jalil Abbas Jilani, called on the international community to pressure Israel to respect the "UN resolution demanding an immediate ceasefire in Gaza." A joint statement issued by Communist Party of India (Marxist) and the Communist Party of India condemned India's decision to abstain on the resolution. The two political parties said it negated the country's support for Palestinian self-determination and argued that it indicated that the country's foreign policy was "shaped by being a subordinate ally of US imperialism." Voreqe Bainimarama, former prime minister of Fiji and current leader of FijiFirst, criticized Fiji's vote against the resolution, stating it contradicted the country's "long-standing legacy as peacekeepers." The Arab Parliament affirmed the resolution, and stated that "serious measures" to pressure Israel to comply with the resolution should be implemented.

== See also ==
- Other United Nations General Assembly Resolutions with the prefix ES-10
- United Nations Security Council Resolution 2712

== Sources ==
- ES-10/21 on the United Nations Digital Library System website
- United Nations Digital Library Voting Data on ES-10/21
