= Yohanan Bein =

Israeli diplomat (1929–2016)

- יוחנן ביין

Permanent Representative of Israel to the United Nations
- In office 1 March 1988 – 26 October 1990
- Preceded by: Benjamin Netanyahu
- Succeeded by: Yoram Aridor

Personal details
- Born: Yohanan Bein; 7 August 1929 Berlin, Weimar Republic
- Died: 5 December 2016 (aged 87) Israel

Yohanan Bein (Hebrew: יוחנן ביין; 7 August 1929 – 5 December 2016) was an Israeli diplomat who served as the Permanent Representative of Israel to the United Nations and the Foreign Ministry's VP from 1988 to 1990.

== Biography ==
Yohanan Bein was born in Berlin, the Weimar Republic (present-day Germany) on 7 August 1929, and was the son of historian Alexander Bein and Betty Bane. He moved with his parents and five brothers to Israel in October 1933.

He studied in the Hebrew Gymnasium Rehavia and served in the Hebrew localities.

During the War of Independence, he was a fighter in the Golani Brigade.

After his release, he graduated with an international economy and international relations at the Hebrew University of Jerusalem.

Bein worked at the Foreign Ministry, served in a variety of Israeli representatives around the world, including Tanzania, Zanzibar, West Germany and Finland.

From 1972 to 1975 served as an Israeli ambassador to the Dominican Republic, as the Israeli ambassador to Jamaica and the Department of International Cooperation Department. Bein was the deputy head of the Israeli delegation to the United Nations, and in 1988 he was appointed as the Permanent Representative of Israel to the United Nations.

On 26 October 1990, he was replaced by his successor, Yoram Aridor After his retirement from the Foreign Ministry, he served as Deputy Chairman of Yad Vashem for five years and then as a director of the Company to detect and restore the Holocaust's experiences.

He died on 5 December 2016.
