= United Nations General Assembly Resolution ES-10/23 =

UN General Assembly Resolution ES-10/23

UN General Assembly Resolution ES-10/23
- State of Palestine In favour Against Abstentions Non-Voting Non member
- Date: 10 May 2024
- Meeting no.: 10th Emergency Special Session (continuation)
- Code: A/ES-10/23 (Document)
- Subject: Admission of new Members to the United Nations
- Voting summary: 143 voted for; 9 voted against; 25 abstained; 16 absent
- Result: Adopted

United Nations General Assembly Resolution ES-10/23 is a resolution of the tenth emergency special session of the United Nations General Assembly which upgrades Palestine's rights in the United Nations as an Observer State, without offering full membership. It urged the Security Council to give "favourable consideration" to Palestine's request. According to the resolution, the Palestinian mission will now have the right to sit in the General Assembly among other states in alphabetical order, rather than in its current observer seat at the back of the chamber. However, the resolution also makes plain that "the State of Palestine, in its capacity as an observer State, does not have the right to vote in the General Assembly or to put forward its candidature to United Nations organs".

The resolution passed with 143 countries voting in favour, 25 abstaining, 16 non-voting, and nine voting against. The nine countries that opposed the resolution were Argentina, the Czech Republic, Hungary, Israel, Micronesia, Nauru, Palau, Papua New Guinea and the United States.

== Additional rights for the State of Palestine ==
The additional rights and privileges of afforded to the State of Palestine are as follows:

- (a) The right to be seated among Member States in alphabetical order;
- (b) The right of inscription on the list of speakers under agenda items other than Palestinian and Middle East issues in the order in which it signifies its desire to speak;
- (c) The right to make statements on behalf of a group, including among representatives of major groups;
- (d) The right to submit proposals and amendments and introduce them, including orally, including on behalf of a group;
- (e) The right to co-sponsor proposals and amendments, including on behalf of a group;
- (f) The right to make explanations of vote on behalf of the States Members of a group;
- (g) The right of reply regarding positions of a group;
- (h) The right to raise procedural motions, including points of order and requests to put proposals to the vote, including the right to challenge the decision of the presiding officer, including on behalf of a group;
- (i) The right to propose items to be included in the provisional agenda of the regular or special sessions and the right to request the inclusion of supplementary or additional items in the agenda of regular or special sessions;
- (j) The right of members of the delegation of the State of Palestine to be elected as officers in the plenary and the Main Committees of the General Assembly;
- (k) The right to full and effective participation in United Nations conferences and international conferences and meetings convened under the auspices of the General Assembly or, as appropriate, under the auspices of other organs of the United Nations, in line with its participation in the high-level political forum on sustainable development.

The State of Palestine will continue not to have the right to vote in the General Assembly or to put forward its candidature to United Nations organs.

== Voting result ==
- ★ - G7 country
- 〇 - Countries that do not recognize Palestine as a state but approve of the resolution
- ◆ - Countries that recognize Palestine as a state but opposed the resolution
- ⁂ - Countries co-authoring the resolution

Agree (143) 70 countries co-sponsored the resolution	Abstention (25)	Oppose (9)	No vote (16)
Algeria; Andorra; Angola; Antigua and Barbuda; Armenia; Australia 〇 Azerbaijan; Bahamas; Bahrain ⁂ Bangladesh ⁂ Barbados; Belarus; Belgium; Belize ⁂ Benin; Bhutan; Bolivia ⁂ Bosnia and Herzegovina; Botswana; Brazil; Brunei Darussalam; Burkina Faso; Burundi; Cabo Verde; Cambodia; Central African Republic; Chad; Chile; China; Colombia ⁂ Comoros; Costa Rica; Côte d'Ivoire; Cuba ⁂ Cyprus; Democratic People's Republic of Korea; Denmark 〇 Djibouti ⁂ Dominica; Dominican Republic; Egypt ⁂ El Salvador; Equatorial Guinea; Eritrea; Estonia 〇 Ethiopia; France ★〇; Gabon; Gambia ⁂ Ghana; Greece; Grenada; Guatemala; Guinea; Guinea-Bissau; Guyana ⁂ Haiti; Honduras; Iceland; India; Indonesia; Iran; Iraq; Ireland; Jamaica; Japan ★〇; Jordan ⁂ Kazakhstan; Kenya; Kuwait ⁂ Kyrgyzstan / Laos; Lebanon ⁂ Lesotho; Libya ⁂ Liechtenstein; Luxembourg; Madagascar; Malaysia ⁂ Maldives ⁂ Mali; Malta; Mauritania ⁂ Mauritius; Mexico; Mongolia; Montenegro; Morocco ⁂ Mozambique; Myanmar; Namibia ⁂ Nepal; New Zealand 〇 Nicaragua ⁂ Niger; Nigeria; Norway; Oman ⁂ Pakistan; Panama; Peru; Philippines; Poland; Portugal; Qatar ⁂ Republic of Korea 〇 Russia; Rwanda; Saint Kitts and Nevis; Saint Lucia ⁂ Saint Vincent and the Grenadines ⁂ San Marino; Saudi Arabia ⁂ Senegal; Serbia; Seychelles; Sierra Leone; Singapore 〇 Slovakia; Slovenia; Somalia; South Africa ⁂ Spain; Sri Lanka; Sudan ⁂ Suriname; Syria; Tajikistan; Thailand; Timor-Leste; Trinidad and Tobago; Tunisia; Turkmenistan; Turkey; Uganda ⁂ United Arab Emirates ⁂ Tanzania; Uruguay; Uzbekistan; Vietnam; Yemen ⁂ Zambia; Zimbabwe	Albania; Austria; Bulgaria; Canada ★ Croatia; Fiji; Finland; Georgia; Germany ★ Italy ★ Latvia; Lithuania; Malawi; Marshall IslandsMoldova; Monaco; Netherlands; North Macedonia; Paraguay; Romania; Sweden; Switzerland; Ukraine; United Kingdom ★ Vanuatu	Argentina ◆ Czech Republic ◆ Hungary ◆ Israel; Micronesia; Nauru; Palau; Papua New Guinea ◆ United States of America ★	Afghanistan; Cameroon; Congo; Democratic Republic of the Congo; Ecuador; Eswatini; Kiribati; Liberia; Samoa; São Tomé and Príncipe; Solomon Islands; South Sudan; Togo; Tonga; Tuvalu; Venezuela ⁂
Observer: Holy See , State of Palestine ⁂

== UNESCO Voting record ==
Agree	Abstention	Oppose	Not Present to Vote	Ineligible to Vote
Afghanistan; Albania; Algeria; Angola; Antigua and Barbuda; Azerbaijan; Bahamas; Bahrain; Bangladesh; Barbados; Belarus; Belize; Bhutan; Bolivia; Bosnia and Herzegovina; Botswana; Brazil; Brunei Darussalam; Bulgaria; Cabo Verde; Central African Republic; Chad; Chile; China; Colombia; Congo; Costa Rica; Cuba; Djibouti; Dominica; Dominican Republic; Ecuador; Egypt; El Salvador; Eritrea; France; Gabon; Georgia; Ghana; Greece; Guyana; Haiti; Iceland; India; Indonesia; Iran; Iraq; Ireland; Jamaica; Jordan; Kazakhstan; Kenya; North Korea; Kuwait; Kyrgyzstan; Laos; Lebanon; Lesotho; Libya; Madagascar; Mali; Mauritania; Mauritius; Mongolia / Morocco; Mozambique; Myanmar; Namibia; Nepal; Nicaragua; Niger; Nigeria; Norway; Oman; Pakistan; Peru; Philippines; Poland; Qatar; Russian Federation; Saint Kitts and Nevis; Saint Lucia; Saint Vincent and the Grenadines; Saudi Arabia; Senegal; Serbia; Seychelles; Slovakia; Slovenia; Somalia; South Africa; South Sudan; Spain; Sri Lanka; Sudan; Suriname; Sweden; Syria; Tajikistan; Tanzania; Thailand; Togo; Trinidad and Tobago; Tunisia; Turkey; Tuvalu; Uganda; Ukraine; United Arab Emirates; Uruguay; Uzbekistan; Vanuatu; Vietnam; Yemen; Zambia; Zimbabwe	Argentina; Australia; Austria; Belgium; Cameroon; Cook Islands; Côte d'Ivoire; Croatia; Cyprus; Denmark; Estonia; Fiji; Finland; Germany; Hungary; Italy; Japan; South Korea; Latvia; Liberia; Lithuania; Luxembourg; Malta; Mexico; Moldova; Monaco; Montenegro; Netherlands; New Zealand; North Macedonia; Portugal; Romania; San Marino; Singapore; Switzerland; Tonga; United Kingdom	Canada; Czechia; Guatemala; Honduras; Marshall Islands; Micronesia; Nauru; Palau; Panama; Papua New Guinea; Paraguay; Solomon Islands; United States of America	Armenia; Burkina Faso; Burundi; Comoros; Democratic Republic of the Congo; Equatorial Guinea; Eswatini; Guinea-Bissau; Kiribati; Malawi; Maldives; Rwanda; Samoa; Sao Tome and Principe; Timor-Leste; Turkmenistan; Venezuela	Benin; Cambodia; Grenada; Niue; Sierra Leone
Observer: Holy See , State of Palestine and Not a member: Israel, Liechtenstein

== UNESCO World Heritage Committee vote on Jerusalem leg ==
Approved (11)	Abstained (7)	Opposed (1)	Absent (1)
Armenia; Belize; Cameroon; Congo; Dominican Republic; Guyana; Ireland; Luxembourg; Mozambique; Saudi Arabia; Zambia	Bangladesh; Equatorial Guinea; Mali; Nigeria; Portugal; Romania; Vanuatu	Kiribati	Gambia

Approved (11)	Abstained (6)	Opposed (2)	Absent (2)
Burundi; Egypt; Gabon; Maldives; Myanmar; Norway; Russian Federation; Serbia; Suriname; Uzbekistan; Yemen	Albania; Cyprus; Latvia; Poland; Solomon Islands; Tonga	Honduras; Palau	Benin; Samoa

Approved (4)	Abstained (2)	Opposed (3)	Absent (1)
El Salvador; Kuwait; Madagascar; Saint Vincent and the Grenadines	Antigua and Barbuda; Georgia	Canada; Nauru; Papua New Guinea	Haiti

== Reactions ==
=== National representatives ===
- Argentina: Despite recognizing the State of Palestine since 2010, Argentina distanced itself from other countries of the world, and voted against the resolution upon orders of President Javier Milei, who had earlier said that siding with Israel is a "moral obligation". Representative to the UN Ricardo Lagorio confirmed that Argentina voted in accordance with directives from President Milei and Foreign Minister Diana Mondino.
- China: The Chinese ambassador to the UN Fu Cong stated that, "It is the common responsibility of the international community to support and advance the process of Palestinian independent Statehood, and provide strong support for the implementation of the two-State solution and a lasting peace in the Middle East".
- Palau: President Surangel Whipps Jr. justified Palau's decision to oppose the vote by saying that "[Palau] support[s] the thought that says we shouldn't go into any country and abduct its people or kill them, and also keep them as hostages", adding that Palau's vote reflected the country's support for Israel's right to self-defense.
- Switzerland: Swiss Ambassador Pascale Christine Baeriswyl voiced Switzerland's firm support to the two-state solution, stating that only a negotiated solution in which two states – Israel and Palestine – live side by side in peace and security can lead to lasting peace. Ambassador Baeriswyl also voiced deep concern over the catastrophic situation of civilians in the ongoing conflict in Gaza, stating that it could worsen further in the event of a major Israeli military offensive in Rafah.
- UK: Barbara Woodward, Ambassador of the United Kingdom, said that her country remains "firmly committed" to the two-state solution that guarantees security and stability for both the Israeli and the Palestinian people. She said that the UK abstained from the vote because "we believe the first step towards achieving this goal is resolving the immediate crisis in Gaza" and she further stated that "the fastest way to end the conflict is "to secure a deal which gets the hostages out and allows for a pause in the fighting".
- US: The United States voted against the resolution, with US Ambassador to the UN Robert Wood stating the negative vote was an "acknowledgment that statehood will come from a process that involves direct negotiations between the parties", adding, "There is no other path that guarantees Israel's security and future as a democratic Jewish State. There is no other path that guarantees Palestinians can live in peace and dignity in a State of their own".

== See also ==
- Other United Nations General Assembly Resolutions with the prefix ES-10
