= Terra Santa College =

School in Nicosia, oldest one in Cyprus

- Κολέγιο Τέρρα Σάντα
- Nicosia; Cyprus

Information
- Type: selective co-educational school
- Motto: S. Mons Sion in Jerusalem
- Established: 1646; 380 years ago
- Age range: 4-18
- Website: www.terrasantacy.com

Terra Santa College (Greek: Κολέγιο Τέρρα Σάντα) is the oldest school in Cyprus.

== History ==
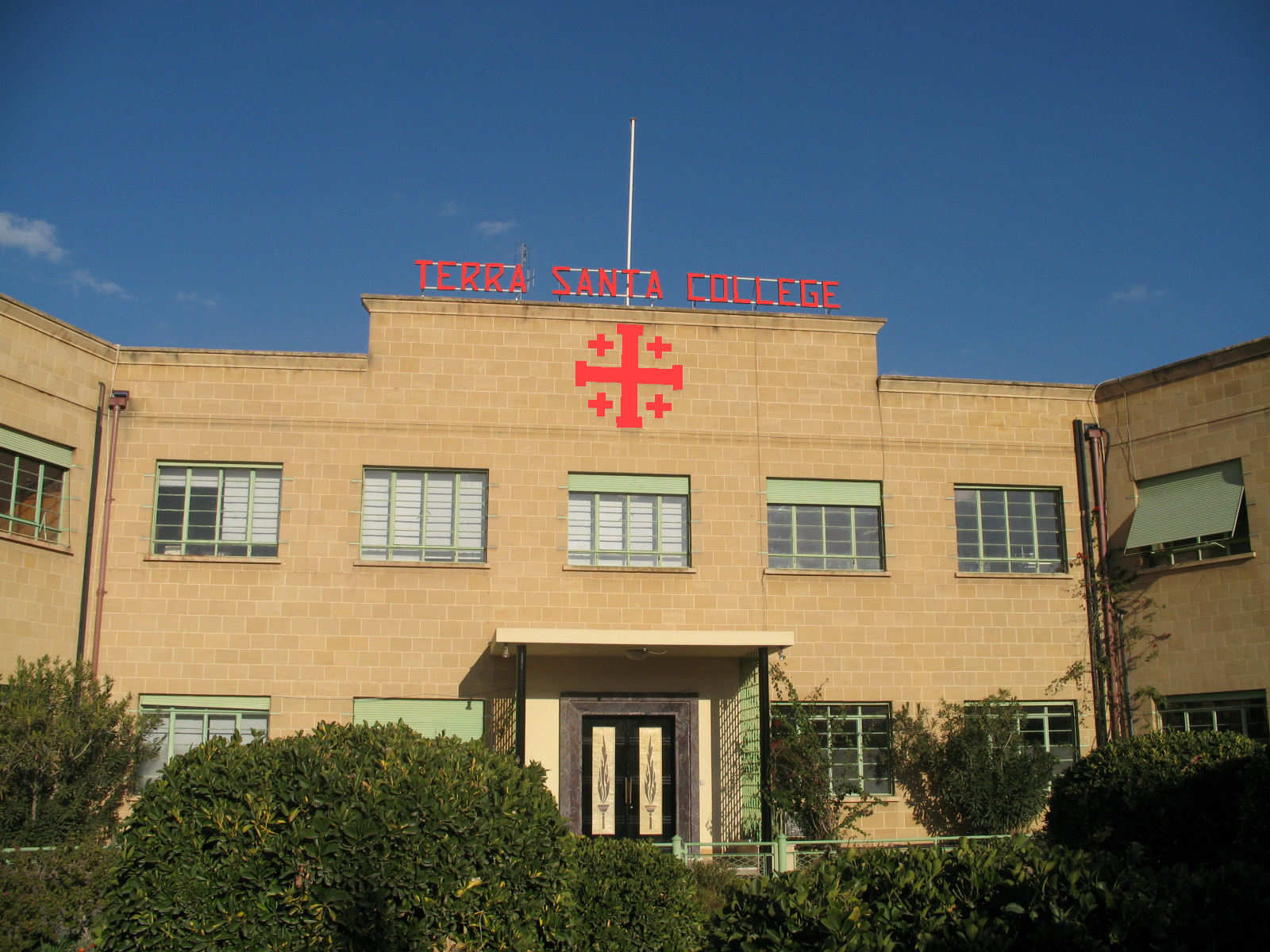
Terra Santa College - Nicosia

The Custody of the Holy Land, the order of the Franciscan friars which was situated in Jerusalem, founded the Terra Santa College in Nicosia, Cyprus in 1646. The college initially operated as a primary school, while in 1913 it broadened its horizons with the creation of a secondary school. The nursery school was established in 1970, bringing the school to the current form which comprises both primary and secondary education.

On the 28th of January 2013, Terra Santa School and the University of Cyprus signed an agreement which recognizes the Terra Santa School as a prototype and experimental model school of the University of Cyprus.

== Notable alumni ==
- Uri Geller - illusionist, magician

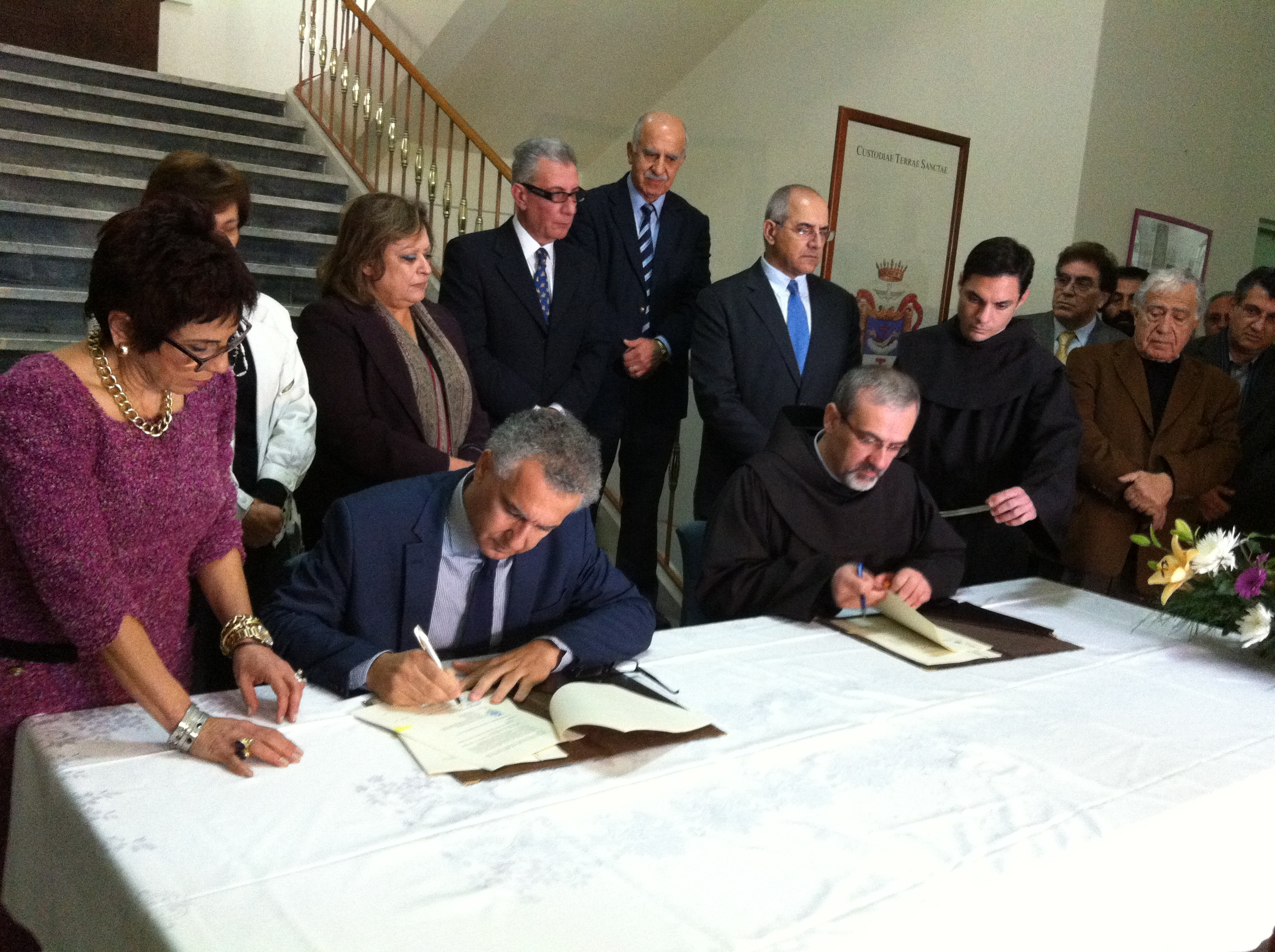
The signing of the agreement with the University of Cyprus
