= Palestinian Ambassador to the United Nations =

Leader of the Palestinian delegation to the United Nations

The Palestinian Ambassador to the United Nations, formally known as the Permanent Observer Mission of the State of Palestine to the United Nations, is the leader of the delegation charged with representing the State of Palestine at the United Nations. Despite the formal title, both "Ambassador" and "Permanent Observer" are used. The incumbent Permanent Observer is Riyad Mansour.

== History ==
In November 1974, the PLO was recognized as competent on all matters concerning the question of Palestine by the UN General Assembly granting them observer status as a "non-state entity" at the UN. After the 1988 Declaration of Independence, the UN General Assembly officially "acknowledged" the proclamation and decided to use the designation "Palestine" instead of "Palestine Liberation Organization" in the UN.

On 29 November 2012, in a 138-9 vote (with 41 abstentions and 5 absences), the United Nations General Assembly passed resolution 67/19, upgrading the status of Palestinian delegation within the United Nations system from an "observer entity" to a "non-member observer state", which was described as recognition of the PLO's sovereignty.

The UN has permitted the State of Palestine to title its representative office to the UN as "The Permanent Observer Mission of the State of Palestine to the United Nations", and Palestine has instructed its diplomats to officially represent "The State of Palestine"—no longer the Palestinian National Authority.

On 17 December 2012, UN Chief of Protocol Yeocheol Yoon declared that "the designation of 'State of Palestine' shall be used by the Secretariat in all official United Nations documents", thus recognising the title 'State of Palestine' as the state's official name for all UN purposes. As of 23 September 2025, 157 (81.3%) of the 193 member states of the United Nations have recognised the State of Palestine.

== Office holders ==
The following is a chronological list of those who have held the office:

No.	Image	Ambassador to UN	Years served	U.N. Secretary-General	Palestinian Leadership
1		Zuhdi Labib Terzi	1974–1982	Kurt Waldheim	Yasser Arafat
1		Zuhdi Labib Terzi	1982–1991	Javier Pérez de Cuéllar	Yasser Arafat
2		Nasser al-Qudwa	1991–1997	Boutros Boutros-Ghali	Yasser Arafat
2		Nasser al-Qudwa	1997–2004	Kofi Annan	Yasser Arafat
2		Nasser al-Qudwa	2004–2005	Kofi Annan	Mahmoud Abbas
3		Riyad Mansour	2004–2005	Kofi Annan	Mahmoud Abbas
3		Riyad Mansour	2005–2017	Ban Ki-moon	Mahmoud Abbas
3		Riyad Mansour	2017–present	António Guterres	Mahmoud Abbas

== See also ==
- Foreign relations of the Palestine Liberation Organization
- International recognition of the State of Palestine
- Palestinian government
