= Riyad Mansour =

Permanent Observer of Palestine to the UN since 2005

- رياض منصور
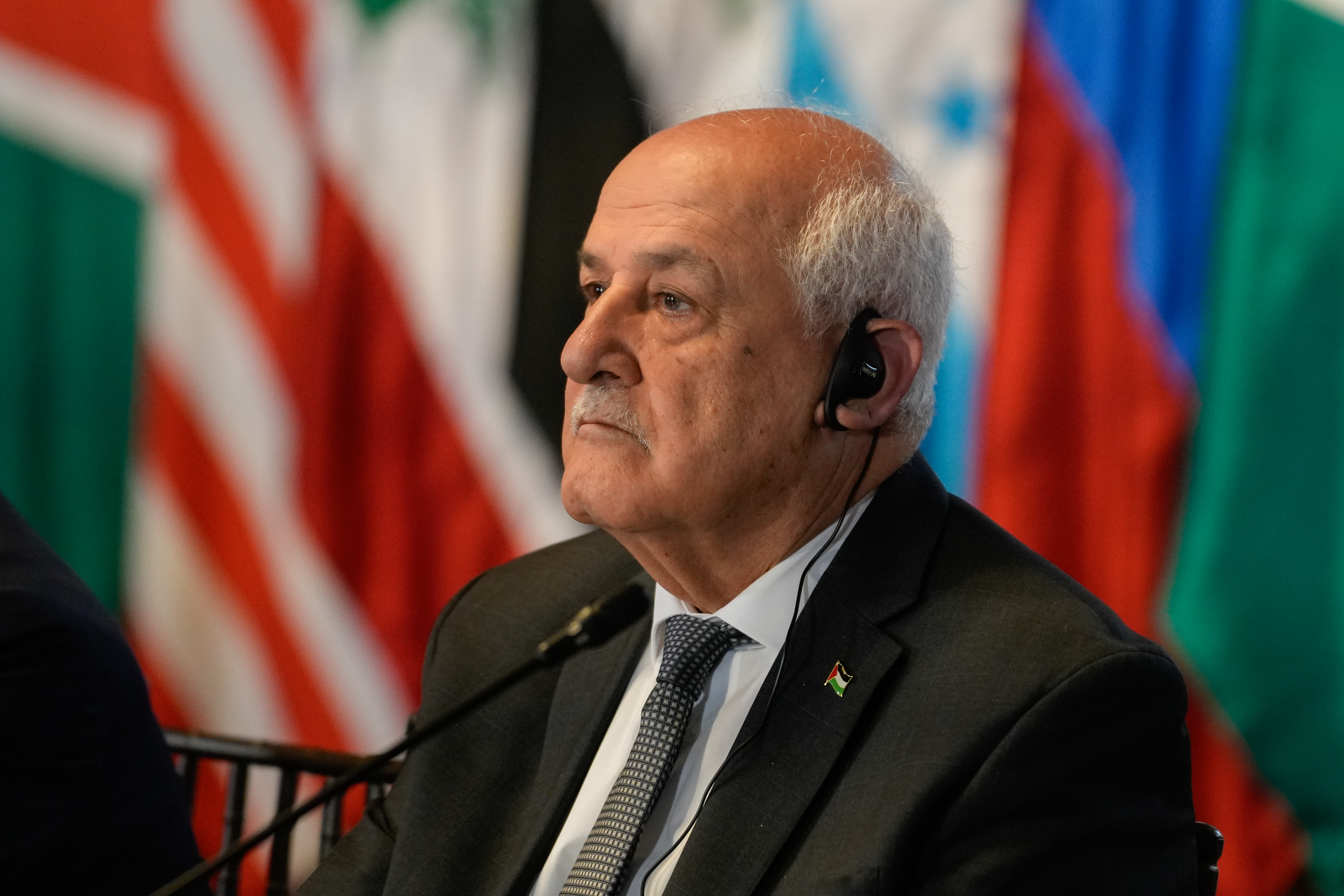
- Mansour at the Bogotá conference, July 2025

3rd Palestinian Ambassador to the United Nations
- Incumbent
- Assumed office 17 September 2005
- President: Mahmoud Abbas
- Preceded by: Nasser al-Qudwa

Personal details
- Born: 21 May 1947 (age 79) Ramallah, Mandatory Palestine
- Citizenship: Palestine; United States
- Education: Youngstown State University; University of Akron

Riyad H. Mansour (Arabic: رياض منصور; born 21 May 1947) is a Palestinian diplomat and since 2005 has been the Permanent Observer of Palestine to the United Nations. Previous to Mansour's appointment to Permanent Observer, Mansour served as the Deputy Permanent Observer of Palestine to the United Nations from 1983 to 1994. In 2005, President of the Palestinian National Authority Mahmoud Abbas appointed him to succeed Nasser al-Qudwa as Permanent Observer for Palestine to the UN. Under Mansour, the Permanent Observer Mission of Palestine to the United Nations changed from being an "entity" to being a "non-Member Observer State" on 29 November 2012.

== Early life and education ==
Mansour's father moved to the United States in the 1950s as a refugee and became a steelworker in Ohio. He later sent for his seven children from the West Bank, including Riyad, who was born on 21 May 1947. The refugee family lived in Ramallah, Occupied West Bank. Mounsour later naturalized as an American citizen. He has a Bachelor of Arts degree in philosophy and a Master of Science degree in education counselling from Youngstown State University, and a Ph.D. in counselling from the University of Akron. In 2002, Mansour served as an adjunct professor in the Political Science Department at the University of Central Florida.

== Statements on the Gaza war ==
Mansour has stated that events of the Gaza war amounted to "the most documented genocide in history". In September 2024, he was given a new seat at the UN General Assembly after a vote. On 28 May 2025, while recounting killed children in Gaza, Mansour broke down, banged the UN Security Council table and said, "This is unbearable, how could anyone?" before relooking at the list and eventually maintaining composure.

== See also ==
- Ibrahim M. Khraishi
- Foreign Affairs Minister of the Palestinian National Authority
- Foreign relations of the Palestine Liberation Organization
