= United Nations General Assembly Resolution ES-10/20 =

Diplomatic response to the 2018 Gaza border crisis

UN General Assembly Resolution ES-10/20
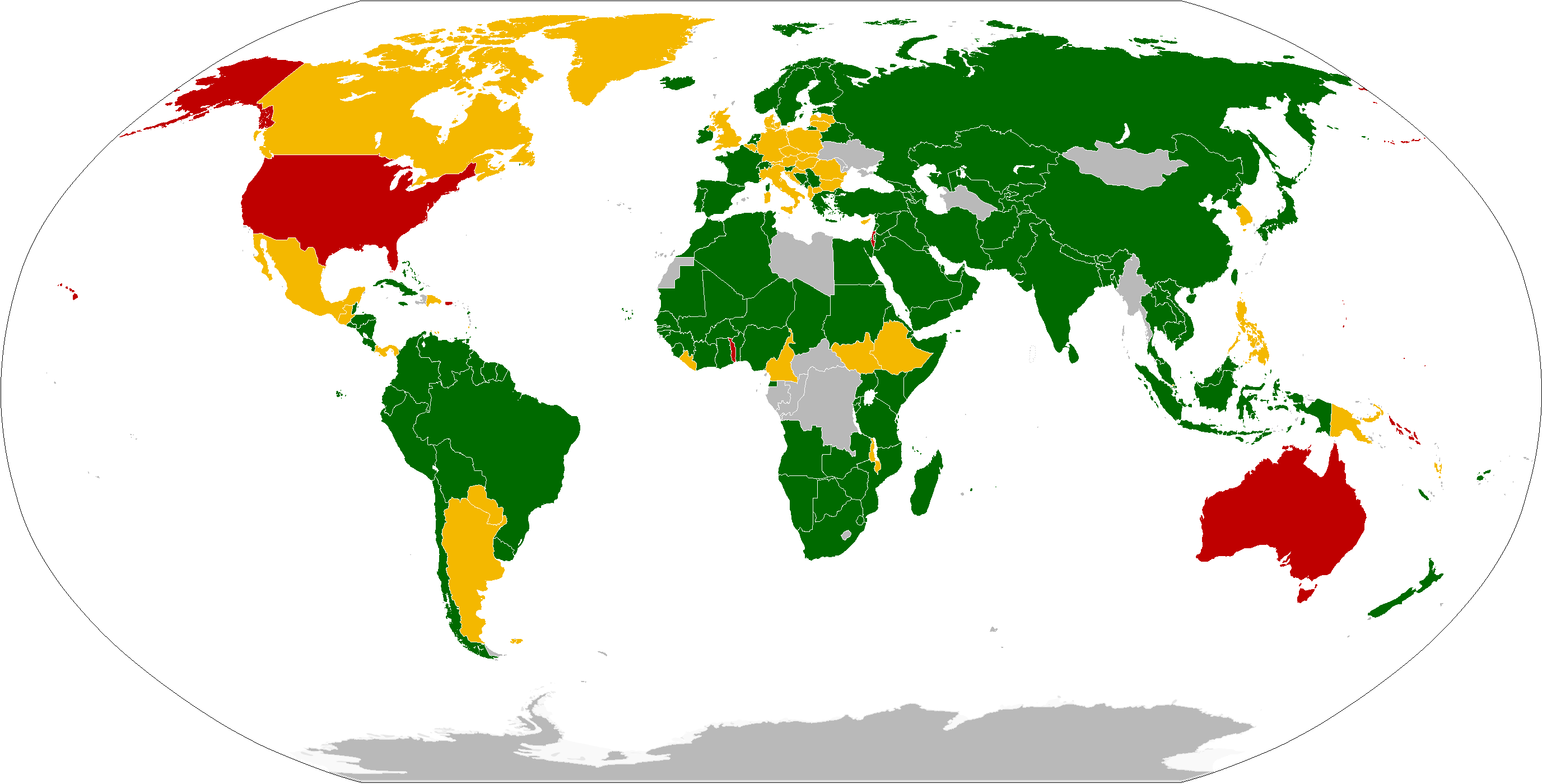
- Voted in favor Voted against Abstained Not present
- Date: 13 June 2018
- Meeting no.: 10th Emergency Special Session (continuation)
- Code: A/RES/ES-10/20 (Document)
- Subject: "Illegal Israeli actions in Occupied East Jerusalem and the rest of the Occupied Palestinian Territory" and "Protection of the Palestinian civilian population"
- Voting summary: 120 voted for; 8 voted against; 45 abstained
- Result: Adopted

United Nations General Assembly Resolution ES-10/20 is a resolution of the Tenth emergency special session of the United Nations General Assembly criticizing the Israeli response to the 2018 Gaza border protests. The resolution was sponsored by Algeria, Turkey and the State of Palestine passed with 120 voting in favour, 8 against, and 45 abstentions.

== Resolution text ==
The full text of the ES-10/L.23 resolution:

Protection of the Palestinian civilian population

The General Assembly,

Recalling its relevant resolutions regarding the question of Palestine,

Recalling also its relevant resolutions on the protection of civilians, including resolution 71/144 of 13 December 2016 on the status of the Protocols Additional to the Geneva Conventions of 1949 and relating to the protection of victims of armed conflicts, resolution 72/131 of 11 December 2017 on the safety and security of humanitarian personnel and protection of United Nations personnel and resolution 72/175 of 19 December 2017 on the safety of journalists and the issue of impunity,

Recalling further the relevant reports of the Secretary-General, including the most recent report, of 14 May 2018, on the protection of civilians in armed conflict,

Recalling all relevant resolutions of the Security Council, including, inter alia, resolutions 242 (1967) of 22 November 1967, 338 (1973) of 22 October 1973, 605 (1987) of 22 December 1987, 904 (1994) of 18 March 1994, 1397 (2002) of 12 March 2002, 1515 (2003) of 19 November 2003, 1544 (2004) of 19 May 2004, 1850 (2008) of 16 December 2008, 1860 (2009) of 8 January 2009 and 2334 (2016) of 23 December 2016,

Recalling also the statement by the President of the Security Council of 28 July 2014,

Bearing in mind the letter dated 21 October 2015 from the Secretary-General addressed to the President of the Security Council,

Recalling Security Council resolutions on the protection of civilians in armed conflict, including resolutions on children and armed conflict, including, inter alia, resolutions 1894 (2009) of 11 November 2009 and 2225 (2015) of 18 June 2015, as well as relevant statements by its President, and resolutions on the protection of medical and humanitarian personnel and on the protection of journalists, media professionals and associated personnel in armed conflicts, including, inter alia, resolutions 2222 (2015) of 27 May 2015 and 2286 (2016) of 3 May 2016, as well asother relevant resolutions and statements by its President,

Reaffirming the obligation to respect and ensure respect for international humanitarian law in all circumstances in accordance with article 1 of the Geneva Conventions of 12 August 1949,

Expressing its grave concern at the escalation of violence and tensions and the deterioration of the situation in the Occupied Palestinian Territory, including East Jerusalem, in particular since 30 March 2018, and its deep alarm at the loss of civilian lives and the high number of casualties among Palestinian civilians, particularly in the Gaza Strip, including casualties among children, caused by the Israeli forces,

Condemning all acts of violence against civilians, including acts of terror, as well as all acts of provocation, incitement and destruction,

Reaffirming the right to peaceful assembly and protest, and freedom of expression and of association,

Emphasizing the need to pursue measures of accountability, and stressing in this regard the importance of ensuring independent and transparent investigations in accordance with international standards,

Alarmed at the exacerbation of the dire humanitarian crisis in the Gaza Strip, and stressing the need to achieve a sustainable solution to this crisis in line with international law,

Stressing the particular impact that armed conflict has on women and children, including as refugees and displaced persons, as well as on other civilians who may have specific vulnerabilities, including persons with disabilities and older persons, and stressing the need for the Security Council and Member States to strengthen further the protection of civilians,

Recalling that a lasting solution to the Israeli-Palestinian conflict can only be achieved by peaceful means in accordance with international law and the relevant United Nations resolutions and through credible and direct negotiations,

Stressing that the Gaza Strip constitutes an integral part of the Palestinian territory occupied in 1967,

Reaffirming the right of all States in the region to live in peace within secure and internationally recognized borders,

1. Calls for full respect by all parties for international human rights law and international humanitarian law, including in regard to the protection of the civilian population, and reiterates the need to take appropriate steps to ensure the safety and well-being of civilians and ensure their protection, as well as to ensure accountability for all violations;

2. Deplores the use of any excessive, disproportionate and indiscriminate force by the Israeli forces against Palestinian civilians in the Occupied Palestinian Territory, including East Jerusalem, and particularly in the Gaza Strip, including the use of live ammunition against civilian protesters, including children, as well as medical personnel and journalists, and expresses its grave concern at the loss of innocent lives;

3. Demands that Israel, the occupying Power, refrain from such actions and fully abide by its legal obligations and responsibilities under the fourth Geneva Convention relative to the Protection of Civilian Persons in Time of War, of 12 August 1949;

4. Deplores any actions that could provoke violence and endanger civilian lives, and calls upon all actors to ensure that protests remain peaceful;

5. Also deplores the firing of rockets from the Gaza Strip against Israeli civilian areas;

6. Calls for urgent steps to ensure an immediate, durable and fully respected ceasefire;

7. Also calls for the exercise of maximum restraint and calm by all parties, and stresses the need for immediate and significant steps to stabilize the situation and to reverse negative trends on the ground;

8. Stresses the need to respond to situations of armed conflict where civilians are being targeted or humanitarian assistance to civilians is being deliberately obstructed, including through the consideration of appropriate measures that may be taken in accordance with the Charter of the United Nations;

9. Calls for the consideration of measures to guarantee the safety and protection of the Palestinian civilian population in the Occupied Palestinian Territory, including in the Gaza Strip;

10. Also calls for immediate steps towards ending the closure and the restrictions imposed by Israel on movement and access into and out of the Gaza Strip, including through the sustained opening of the crossing points of the Gaza Strip for the flow of humanitarian aid, commercial goods and persons in accordance with international law, including as it pertains to legitimate security requirements;

11. Demands that all parties cooperate with medical and humanitarian personnel to allow and facilitate unimpeded access to the civilian population, and calls for the cessation of all forms of violence and intimidation directed against medical and humanitarian personnel;

12. Urges the provision of immediate and unimpeded humanitarian assistance to the Palestinian civilian population in the Gaza Strip, bearing in mind critical medical, food, water and fuel needs, and urges increased support to the United Nations Relief and Works Agency for Palestine Refugees in the Near East, recognizing the vital role of the Agency, alongside other United Nations agencies and humanitarian organizations, in providing humanitarian and emergency assistance, notably in the Gaza Strip;

13. Encourages tangible steps towards intra-Palestinian reconciliation, including in support of the mediation efforts of Egypt, and concrete steps to reunite the Gaza Strip and the West Bank under the legitimate Palestinian Government and ensure its effective functioning in the Gaza Strip;

14. Welcomes and urges further engagement by the Secretary-General and the United Nations Special Coordinator for the Middle East Peace Process and Personal Representative of the Secretary-General to the Palestine Liberation Organization and the Palestinian Authority to assist, in cooperation with concerned partners, in the efforts to immediately de-escalate the situation and address urgent infrastructure, humanitarian and economic development needs, including through the implementation of projects endorsed by the Ad Hoc Liaison Committee for the Coordination of the International Assistance to Palestinians;

15. Requests the Secretary-General to examine the present situation and to submit a written report, as soon as possible, but not later than 60 days from the adoption of the present resolution, containing, inter alia, his proposals on ways and means for ensuring the safety, protection and well-being of the Palestinian civilian population under Israeli occupation, including, inter alia, recommendations regarding an international protection mechanism;

16. Calls for renewed and urgent efforts to create the conditions necessary to launch credible negotiations on all final status issues to achieve, without delay, an end to the Israeli occupation that began in 1967 and a comprehensive, just and lasting comprehensive peace based on the vision of a region where two democratic States, Israel and Palestine, live side by side in peace with secure and recognized borders, on the basis of the relevant United Nations resolutions, the Madrid terms of reference, including the principle of land for peace, the Arab Peace Initiative 6 and the Quartet road map, as called for in Security Council resolution 2334 (2016) and other relevant resolutions;

17. Decides to adjourn the tenth emergency special session temporarily and to authorize the President of the General Assembly at its most recent session to resume its meeting upon request from Member States.

== Voting record ==
In favour (120) 3 states sponsoring	Abstaining (45)	Against (8)	Absent (20)
Afghanistan; Algeria; Andorra; Angola; Armenia; Azerbaijan; Bahamas; Bahrain; Bangladesh; Barbados; Belarus; Belgium; Belize; Benin; Bhutan; Bolivia (Plurinational State of); Bosnia and Herzegovina; Botswana; Brazil; Brunei Darussalam; Burkina Faso; Burundi; Cabo Verde; Cambodia; Chad; Chile; China; Colombia; Comoros; Costa Rica; Cote D'Ivoire; Cuba; Democratic People's Republic of Korea; Djibouti; Ecuador; Egypt; El Salvador; Equatorial Guinea; Eritrea; Estonia; Finland; France; Gambia (Republic of The); Georgia; Greece; Grenada; Guinea; Guinea-Bissau; Guyana; Iceland; India; Indonesia; Iran (Islamic Republic of); Iraq; Ireland; Jamaica; Japan; Jordan; Kazakhstan; Kenya; Kuwait / Kyrgyzstan; Lao People's Democratic Republic; Lebanon; Lesotho; Liechtenstein; Luxembourg; Malaysia; Maldives; Mali; Malta; Mauritania; Mauritius; Montenegro; Morocco; Mozambique; Namibia; Nepal; New Zealand; Nicaragua; Niger; Nigeria; Norway; Oman; Pakistan; Peru; Portugal; Qatar; Russian Federation; Saint Vincent and the Grenadines; Saudi Arabia; Senegal; Serbia; Sierra Leone; Slovenia; Somalia; South Africa; Spain; Sri Lanka; Sudan; Suriname; Sweden; Switzerland; Syrian Arab Republic; Tajikistan; Thailand; Timor-Leste; Trinidad and Tobago; Tunisia; Turkey; Uganda; United Arab Emirates; United Republic of Tanzania; Uruguay; Uzbekistan; Venezuela (Bolivarian Republic of); Viet Nam; Yemen; Zambia; Zimbabwe	Albania; Antigua and Barbuda; Argentina; Austria; Bulgaria; Cameroon; Canada; Croatia; Cyprus; Czech Republic; Denmark; Dominican Republic; Ethiopia; Fiji; Germany; Ghana; Guatemala; Honduras; Hungary; Italy; Latvia; Liberia; Lithuania; Malawi; Mexico; Monaco; Netherlands; Panama; Papua New Guinea; Paraguay; Philippines; Poland; Republic of Korea; Romania; Rwanda; Saint Lucia; Samoa; San Marino; Singapore; Slovakia; South Sudan; The Former Yugoslav Republic of Macedonia; Tuvalu; United Kingdom of Great Britain and Northern Ireland; Vanuatu	Australia; Israel; Marshall Islands; Micronesia, Federated States of Nauru; Solomon Islands; Togo; United States of America	Central African Republic; Congo; Democratic Republic of the Congo; Dominica; Eswatini (the Kingdom of); Gabon; Haiti; Kiribati; Libya; Madagascar; Mongolia; Myanmar; Palau; Republic of Moldova; Saint Kitts and Nevis; Sao Tome and Principe; Seychelles; Tonga; Turkmenistan; Ukraine
Observer States: Holy See and State of Palestine

== See also ==
- Other United Nations General Assembly Resolutions with the prefix ES-10
- List of United Nations resolutions concerning Israel
- List of United Nations resolutions concerning Palestine
- 2018 Gaza border protests
- Death of Mohammed Sobhi al-Judeili
- Rouzan al-Najjar
