= United Nations Security Council Resolution 1544 =

UN Security Council Resolution 1544
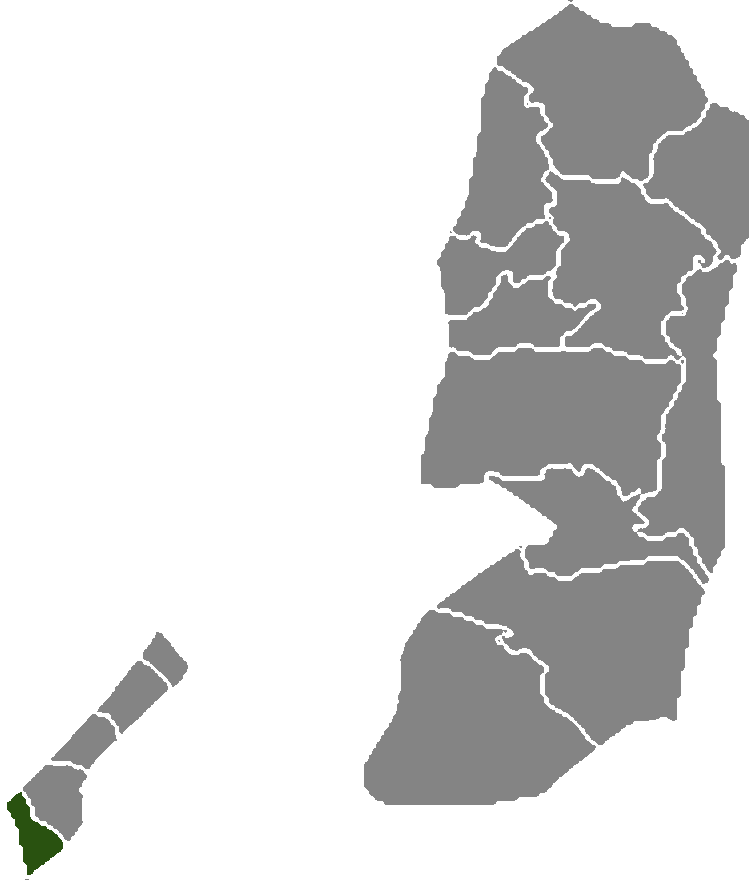
- Rafah Governorate
- Date: 19 May 2004
- Meeting no.: 4,972
- Code: S/RES/1544 (Document)
- Subject: The situation in the Middle East, including the Palestinian question
- Voting summary: 14 voted for; None voted against; 1 abstained
- Result: Adopted

Security Council composition
- Permanent members: China; France; Russia; United Kingdom; United States
- Non-permanent members: Algeria; Angola; Benin; Brazil; Chile; Germany; Pakistan; Philippines; Romania; Spain

United Nations Security Council resolution 1544, adopted on 19 May 2004, after recalling resolutions 242 (1967), 338 (1973), 446 (1979), 1322 (2000), 1397 (2002), 1402 (2002), 1403 (2002), 1405 (2002), 1435 (2002) and 1515 (2003), the Council called on Israel to cease demolishing Palestinian homes.

The United States abstained from the vote on Resolution 1544, saying it had urged Israel to exercise restraint and that the issue of Palestinian militants smuggling weapons through Gaza was not addressed.

== Resolution ==
=== Observations ===
The Security Council reiterated that Israel, as the occupying power, to abide by its legal obligations under the Fourth Geneva Convention, while it was called upon to address its security needs according to international law. It expressed its concern at the deterioration of the situation in the Israeli-occupied territories since 1967 and condemnation of the killing of a Palestinian in the Rafah area.

The preamble of the resolution also expressed concern at the demolition of Palestinian homes in the Rafah camp. The Council recalled the obligations of the Israeli government and the Palestinian Authority under the road map for peace. All acts of terror, violence and destruction were condemned.

=== Acts ===
The Council called on Israel to respect its obligations under international humanitarian law and end the demolition of homes in violation of that law. There was concern at the humanitarian situation of Palestinians made homeless in the Rafah area and emergency assistance was required. Both parties were called upon to end violence, respect legal obligations and immediately implement their obligations under the road map.

== See also ==
- Arab–Israeli conflict
- Israeli–Palestinian conflict
- List of United Nations Security Council Resolutions 1501 to 1600 (2003–2005)
- Second Intifada
- Violence in the Israeli–Palestinian conflict 2004
