= United Nations Security Council Resolution 1860 =

UN Security Council Resolution 1860
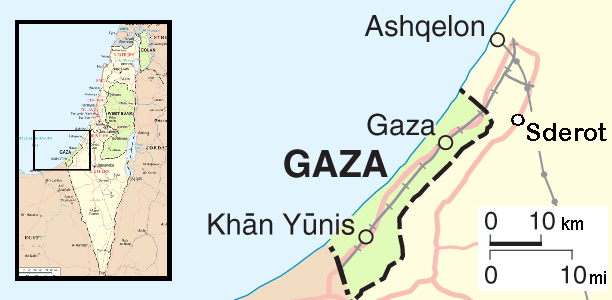
- Map of the Gaza Strip
- Date: 8 January 2009
- Meeting no.: 6,063
- Code: S/2009/1860 (Document)
- Subject: The situation in the Middle East, including the Palestinian question
- Voting summary: 14 voted for; None voted against; 1 abstained
- Result: Approved

Security Council composition
- Permanent members: China; France; Russia; United Kingdom; United States
- Non-permanent members: Austria; Burkina Faso; Costa Rica; Croatia; Japan; Libya; Mexico; Turkey; Uganda; Vietnam

United Nations Security Council Resolution 1860, adopted on January 8, 2009, after recalling resolutions 242 (1967), 338 (1973), 1397 (2002), 1515 (2003) and 1850 (2008) on the Israeli–Palestinian conflict, the Council called for an immediate ceasefire in the Gaza War following 13 days of fighting between Israel and Hamas.

Ultimately, the resolution was unsuccessful as Israel and Hamas ignored it and the fighting continued.

== Details ==
The resolution called for "an immediate ceasefire in Gaza leading to a full Israeli withdrawal, unimpeded provision through Gaza of food, fuel and medical treatment, and intensified international arrangements to prevent arms and ammunition smuggling." All members stressed the importance of an "immediate and durable ceasefire".

== Voting ==
The resolution was adopted by 14 votes to none against, and one abstention from the United States. Explaining the abstention, U.S. Secretary of State Condoleezza Rice said the U.S. wanted to first see the outcome of the Egyptian peace efforts, but allowed the resolution to go forward because it was a step in the right direction. It was later revealed that the abstention was ordered by U.S. President George W. Bush. Israeli Prime Minister Ehud Olmert has said that Bush was acting on his advice.

== Impact and enforcement ==
Israel's status as a member state of the United Nations means that it is bound under Article 25 of the United Nations Charter to "agree, accept and carry out the decisions of the Security Council". It is generally accepted that Security Council resolutions adopted in the exercise of its primary responsibility for the maintenance of international peace in accordance with the UN Charter are binding upon the member states.

== Reactions ==
=== Israel ===
In a statement released immediately after the Israeli cabinet session on January 9, the government stated it would not accept the UN resolution, declaring that "the IDF will continue to act in order to attain the objectives of the operation—to bring about a change in the security situation in the south of the country—this in accordance with the plans that have been approved upon embarking on the operation." In addition, Israeli Prime Minister Ehud Olmert called the resolution "unworkable" due to continued rocket fire by Hamas.

=== Hamas ===
The same day, Ayman Taha, a Hamas spokesman in Gaza said: "Even though we are the main actors on the ground in Gaza, we were not consulted about this resolution and they have not taken into account our vision and the interests of our people."

== See also ==
- Gaza War
- Israeli–Palestinian conflict
- List of United Nations Security Council Resolutions 1801 to 1900 (2008–2009)
- United Nations Security Council Resolution 660
- List of United Nations resolutions concerning Israel
