= United Nations Security Council Resolution 1435 =

UN Security Council Resolution 1435
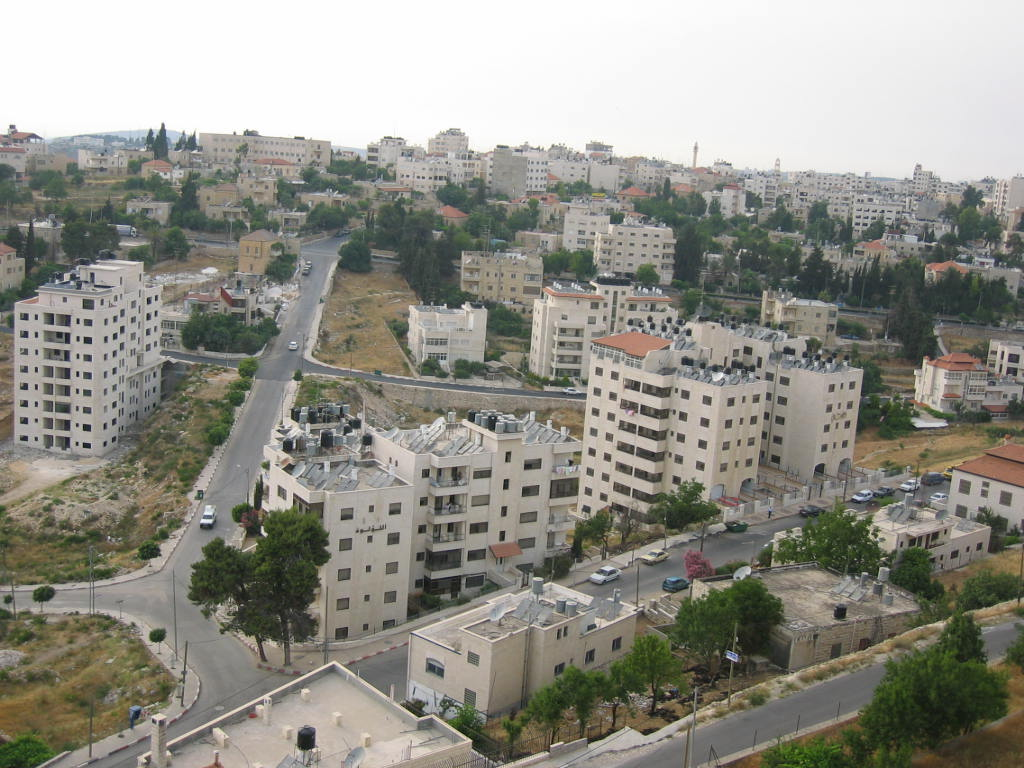
- Ramallah in the West Bank
- Date: 24 September 2002
- Meeting no.: 4,614
- Code: S/RES/1435 (Document)
- Subject: The situation in the Middle East, including the Palestinian question
- Voting summary: 14 voted for; None voted against; 1 abstained
- Result: Adopted

Security Council composition
- Permanent members: China; France; Russia; United Kingdom; United States
- Non-permanent members: Bulgaria; Cameroon; Colombia; Guinea; Ireland; Mauritius; Mexico; Norway; Singapore; Syria

United Nations Security Council resolution 1435, adopted on 24 September 2002, after recalling resolutions 242 (1967), 338 (1973), 1397 (2002), 1402 (2002) and 1403 (2002), the Council demanded the end to Israeli measures in Ramallah, including the destruction of Palestinian infrastructure.

The Security Council reiterated its concern at events that had taken place in the region since September 2000 and their deterioration, particularly terrorist attacks against civilians in Israel and at a Palestinian school in Hebron. It demanded the end of the occupation of the headquarters of the President of the Palestinian Authority Yasser Arafat. Furthermore, there was alarm at the reoccupation of Palestinian cities and restrictions on the freedom of movement of people and goods and the need for all to respect the Fourth Geneva Convention of 1949.

The resolution reiterated the need for a complete cessation of all acts of violence, demanding that Israel end measures in and around Ramallah and to withdraw occupying forces from Palestinian cities to positions held before September 2000. The Palestinian Authority was called upon to ensure that those responsible for the terrorist acts would be brought to justice. It also supported further diplomatic efforts by the Quartet on the Middle East and others in the region and recognised the initiative adopted at the Arab League Summit in Beirut which stated that peace between Israel and the Palestinians could be achieved through the abandonment of the right to return of Palestinian refugees in exchange for the establishment of a Palestinian state in the 1967 borders and the sharing of Jerusalem.

Resolution 1435 was adopted by 14 votes to none against with one abstention from the United States. American representatives John Negroponte and James Cunningham stated that the country would not support a "one-sided resolution".

== See also ==
- Arab–Israeli conflict
- Israeli–Palestinian conflict
- List of United Nations Security Council Resolutions 1401 to 1500 (2002–2003)
- Second Intifada
- Timeline of the Israeli–Palestinian conflict in 2002
