= United Nations Security Council Resolution 1405 =

UN Security Council Resolution 1405
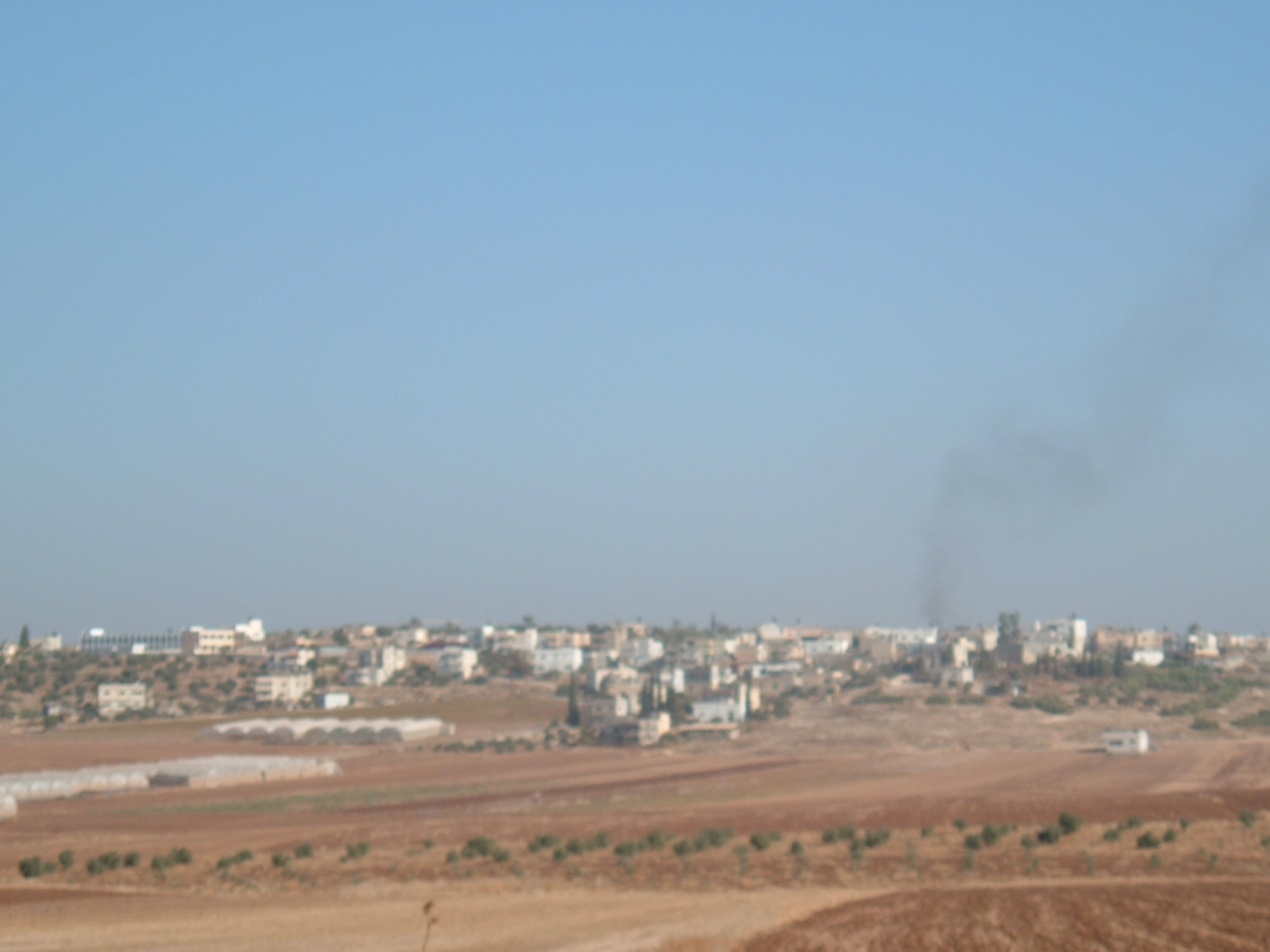
- Jenin in the West Bank
- Date: 19 April 2002
- Meeting no.: 4,516
- Code: S/RES/1405 (Document)
- Subject: The situation in the Middle East, including the Palestinian question
- Voting summary: 15 voted for; None voted against; None abstained
- Result: Adopted

Security Council composition
- Permanent members: China; France; Russia; United Kingdom; United States
- Non-permanent members: Bulgaria; Cameroon; Colombia; Guinea; Ireland; Mauritius; Mexico; Norway; Singapore; Syria

United Nations Security Council resolution 1405, adopted unanimously on 19 April 2002, after recalling resolutions 242 (1967), 338 (1973), 1397 (2002), 1402 (2002) and 1403 (2002), the Council emphasised the necessity of humanitarian access to the Palestinian population.

The Security Council was concerned by the humanitarian situation of the Palestinian people, particularly in the Jenin refugee camp where there were reports of deaths and destruction. It called for the lifting of restrictions against the operations of humanitarian organisations such as the International Committee of the Red Cross and United Nations Relief and Works Agency for Palestine Refugees in the Near East and for all concerned to ensure the safety of civilians and respect international humanitarian law.

The resolution emphasised the urgency of humanitarian and medical access to the Palestinian civilian population and welcomed the intention of the Secretary-General Kofi Annan to dispatch a fact-finding team to gather information regarding events at the Jenin refugee camp during Operation Defensive Shield. The resolution does not describe the mission as an investigation as demanded by Arab nations, due to diplomatic pressure from the United States and Israel.

The fact-finding mission, which Israel had accepted, was to be appointed by Kofi Annan.

== See also ==
- Arab–Israeli conflict
- Israeli–Palestinian conflict
- List of United Nations Security Council Resolutions 1401 to 1500 (2002–2003)
- Second Intifada
