= Khuzaʽa =

Khuzaʽa may refer to:

- Khuzaʽa, Khan Yunis, a Palestinian town in the southern Gaza Strip
- Banū Khuzaʽah, an Arabian tribe
