= PMRS =

PMRS is an acronym that may refer to:

- Palestinian Medical Relief Society, a community based Arab health organization, that offers grassroots medical services in the West Bank
- Plasma membrane redox system
