= Iyad Alasttal =

Palestinian filmmaker (born c. 1987)

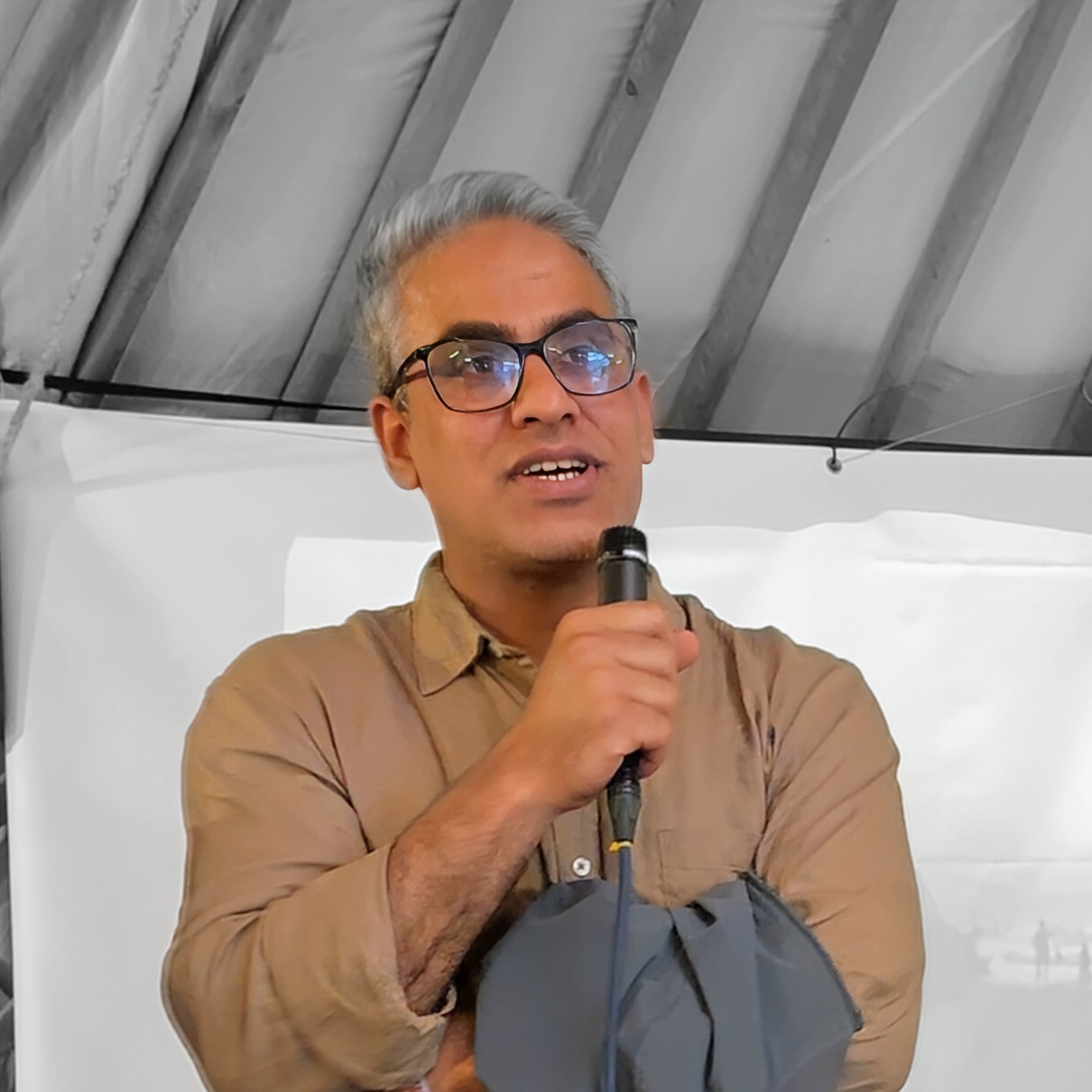
- Iyad Alastall in 2025
- Born: c. 1987 (age 38–39); Khan Yunis, Palestine
- Occupation: filmmaker

Iyad Alasttal (born c. 1987) is a Palestinian filmmaker from Gaza living in France. His documentary films include Razan, une trace du papillon (Razan, a trace of the butterfly), the story of Razan al-Najjar, a paramedic from the Palestinian Medical Relief Society (PMRS) who was killed in June 2018 by an Israeli sniper during the Great March of Return. He also collaborated with French filmmaker Roland Nurier, who was barred from entering Gaza, on filming footage for Yallah Gaza (2024).

Born in Khan Yunis, Alasttal received a scholarship from the NGO Corsica Palestina to study cinema in Corsica at age 24. His first documentary was about a woman named Salouah, a school bus driver in Gaza.

Since March 2019, Alasttal has led the initiative Gaza Stories, a multimedia project in French and English showing daily life in the Gaza Strip.

After escaping an attack on Rafah by Israel in February 2024 during the Gaza war, Alasttal moved with his family to France, where he continued to report on the conflict in Gaza. In November of that year, he received an award in Switzerland from the NGO Press Emblem Campaign (PEC), which monitors attacks on journalists worldwide.
