= Death of Mohammed Sobhi al-Judeili =

Mohammed Sobhi al-Judeili (Arabic: لقادر النجار Mohammed Sobhi al-Judeili; 3 June 1983 – 10 June 2019) was a Palestinian paramedic who was killed by the Israel Defense Forces (IDF) while working as a medic during the Great March of Return. He was fatally hit by a bullet from a shot by an Israeli soldier as he tried to help the Red Crescent evacuate the wounded near Israel's border fence with Gaza. The IDF has made no statement and it is possible that he may have been hit by indirect fire. He was the fourth medic to be killed by direct fire since the 2018-2019 protests began at the Gaza border and have continued weekly. He was at Abu Safiyya area, in Jabalia, on the northern edge of the Gaza strip when he was shot in May. Ninety-two civilians were also shot. The United Nations have investigated the shooting of medics and other un-armed civilians by the IDF in February 2019 and have stated that the killings "May constitute War Crimes or Crimes against Humanity.

== Personal life ==
A married father of four children, he had worked as a paramedic for the Red Crescent.

== Other medical personnel deaths ==
On May 15, 2018, Moussa Abu Hassainen, 35, was shot by the Gaza border while wearing a vest that clearly marked him as medical personnel; then on June 1, 2018, a 21 year old nurse/paramedic volunteer, Rouzan al-Najjar was killed by a bullet that was shot at her despite being clearly identified by the clothing and vest the medics wear while assisting the injured. On August 10, 2018, a medic was shot in the chest while treating a protester wounded in border skirmishes. Abed Abdullah Qotati was 22 and wearing his high-visibility vest when he was shot by Israeli soldiers. A UN probe into the killings resulted in a report that blamed rules of engagement that were one-sided in the conflict, with un-armed Palestinians charging the border fence and Israeli soldiers responding with live fire, to date Palestinians have reported 685 wounded medical personnel at the weekly border conflicts since 2018.

Israel's use of deadly force was condemned on 13 June 2018 in a United Nations General Assembly Resolution.

== See also ==
- 2018–19 Gaza border protests
