= Killing of Rouzan al-Najjar =

Palestinian nurse and activist

Rouzan al-Najjar
- روزان النجار
- Born: 13 September 1997; Khuza'a, Khan Yunis, Gaza Strip
- Died: 1 June 2018 (aged 20); Gaza
- Cause of death: Gunshot
- Occupation: Nurse
- Known for: Aiding injured Palestinian protesters

Rouzan Ashraf Abdul Qadir al-Najjar (Note: This is a romanization of al-Najjar's Arabic name. Her first name has been romanized as both Rouzan and Razan.) (Arabic: روزان أشراف عبد القادر النجار Rouzān 'Ashrāf 'Abd al-Qādir an-Najjār; 13 September 1997 – 1 June 2018) was a Palestinian paramedic who was killed by the Israeli military while volunteering as a medic during the 2018 Gaza border protests. She was killed by a ricochet fragment of a bullet shot into the ground near her by an Israeli soldier as she tried to help evacuate wounded Palestinian protestors near Israel's border fence with Gaza.

Najjar was born in Khan Younis in the Israeli-occupied Gaza Strip in 1997. The eldest of six children born to Ashraf al-Najjar, she was a resident of Khuzaa, a village near the border with Israel.

The IDF released footage in which she purportedly admitted to participating in the protests as a human shield at the request of Hamas. The video was later found to be a clip from an interview with a Lebanese television station that had been edited by the IDF to take al-Najjar's comments out of context. In the unedited video, she didn't mention Hamas and called herself a "rescuing human shield to protect and save the wounded at the front lines", with everything following "human shield" trimmed out of the Israeli clip. The IDF was widely criticized for attempting posthumous character assassination by tampering with the video.

According to witness testimony, al-Najjar was shot after she and other medics, walking with their hands up and wearing white vests, approached the border fence in order to treat a wounded protester. The IDF first denied that she was targeted, while not ruling out that she may have been hit by indirect fire. Israeli human rights group B'Tselem said that al-Najjar was shot intentionally.

A UN investigation, the results of which were published late February 2019, concluded that Israel may have committed war crimes in its response to the Gaza protests, saying that dozens of children, two journalists and three paramedics, including al-Najjar, were killed by Israeli soldiers despite the fact that they were easily identifiable as such and did not pose any threat to the Israelis.

== Early life ==
Najjar's father used to be employed in Israel in the scrap metal business until restrictions disallowed travel across the border. He then worked in the Strip as a motorbike mechanic but was unemployed at the time of her death. The family lived in an apartment supplied by relatives in Khuza'a, within eyeshot of Israeli soldiers stationed over the border. Their area had a four-metre-high (13 ft) concrete wall installed to shield local residents from Israeli fire.

She, one of a family of eight, grew up witnessing three wars, that of 2008-2009, then Israel's Operation Pillar of Defense when a teenager, aged 16, and shortly afterwards the 7 week 2014 Israel–Gaza conflict in which her neighbourhood was devastated. Too poor to afford a university education, she studied calligraphy and took on coursework in nursing.

== Volunteering ==
Her formal training after volunteering was as a paramedic at Nasser Hospital in Khan Younis and she became an active member of the Palestinian Medical Relief Society, a non-governmental health organization. She wore the white coat of the medics and a medics vest with bandages, and was attending those wounded during protests at the border fence between Gaza and Israel during Ramadan. According to her mother, Najjar attended every Friday event from 7am and 8pm, and would return home spattered with the blood of those whom she had tended care to. Even before her death, she had become something of an icon within the Gaza Strip, with local media published many images of her online, including photos of her bandaging the head of a youth who had been wounded.

Al-Najjar already believed the Israeli army was targeting her months before her death. In April, she told Al Jazeera media that Israeli soldiers had shot directly at her multiple times in a warning not to tend to the wounded in the protests.

She was 21 years old at the time of her death. Najjar was a fixture at the Khan Younis camp and spoke about her role at the fence in an interview, relishing in the idea that a woman could brave the dangers. "In our society women are often judged," she said. "But society has to accept us. If they don't want to accept us by choice, they will be forced to accept us because we have more strength than any man. The strength that I showed the first day of the protests, I dare you to find it in anyone else."

== Death ==
Some 25 Gaza medical personnel and first responders assisting people injured during the border protests, from 30 March to 2 June, had been wounded or killed by Israeli snipers. On 14 May 2018, Dr. Tarek Loubani, clearly identifiable as a doctor, was shot in the leg close to the separation fence, at a site where no protests, fire or smoke occurred. According to his account, an hour later, Musa Abuhassanin, a paramedic who had come to help him was killed with a shot to the chest while performing another rescue mission that day. On the day of her death 100 demonstrating Palestinians were wounded, 40 shot by Israeli live fire.

Medical personnel fine-tuned strategies to avoid being mistaken by snipers for protestors, wearing white jackets with reflective, high-visibility stripes, moving in teams in the direction of casualties, and holding their hands above their heads as they negotiate a pathway past burning tires and plumes of smoke. When in the vicinity of the border, and within speaking range of the Israeli troops, they shout in unison: "Don't shoot. There are wounded." The usual Israeli response was to scream at them to go back.

Al-Najjar was a first responder at the "Great March of Return" that resulted in the 2018 Gaza border protests. On 1 June, the third Friday of Ramadan, 3,000 protestors demonstrated near the fence and Najjar was one of five paramedics on a shift, and had taken all of these precautions according to another of the group, Faris al-Qidra, and was even wearing surgical gloves. They went to rescue a man who was calling for help' after being hit in the face by a tear-gas canister, some 20 metres from the perimeter. Other accounts state the distance as 100 metres from the border. Three shots were heard. A relative, Ibrahim al-Najjar, was one of those who carried her to a waiting ambulance. Shortly afterwards, a Boston-born American woman serving in the IDF was falsely accused on social media of being the sniper in question. The Office of the United Nations High Commissioner for Human Rights performed an investigation that found al-Najjar was clearly marked as a paramedic and that she "did not pose an imminent threat of death or serious injury to the ISF when she was shot". The report concluded that the Commission "found reasonable grounds to believe that Israeli snipers intentionally shot health workers, despite seeing that they were clearly marked as such."

Al-Najjar's death came before she and her fiancé Izzat Shatat were to announce their engagement at the end of Ramadan.

Thousands of Gazans attended her funeral along with hundreds of medical personnel, with her body being wrapped in a Palestinian flag. Her father carried her blood-stained medical jacket, while other mourners demanded revenge.

=== Israeli response ===
An internal IDF review claimed that al-Najjar was not intentionally targeted.

After initially reporting that an internal review showed that al-Najjar was not intentionally targeted, the IDF released video that purportedly showed al-Najjar admitting to being a human shield, with an IDF spokesman saying "Razan al-Najjar is not the angel of mercy Hamas propaganda is making her out to be." The video that was released misleadingly took a prior interview that al-Najjar gave to a Lebanese television station out of context. She had said "I'm here on the line being a protective human shield saving the injured" and added she was at the protests to "save the wounded at the front lines", however the IDF released video cut out everything past "human shield". The Israeli military was widely criticized for its efforts in manipulating the video, with commentators drawing parallels to past instances of the IDF manipulating or otherwise faking evidence. A spokesman for the Israeli Prime Minister denied that editing the video was "political manipulation". The edited video was also shared by the Israeli ambassador to the United Kingdom and the Israeli Ministry of Foreign Affairs. The Israeli ambassador to London, Mark Regev, in a tweet placed the description of her as "medical personnel" in quotation marks and continued that her death was further proof of Hamas' brutality.

Further footage showing an unidentified nurse, her face cannot be seen, was presented as evidence al-Najjar threw a tear-gas canister or smoking grenade, at a distance of some 100 metres from the border was also released by the Israeli army. Describing this video as having also been "tightly edited", The New York Times estimated that footage did not appear to have been taken on the day she was killed, stating also that "the canister does not appear to be aimed at anyone." According to Gideon Levy, the video filmed the nurse, perhaps Najjar, from behind as she flings away a smoke grenade which Israeli soldiers had thrown in her direction.

Media commentators described the IDF's release of selectively edited videos against Al-Najjar as part of a "narrative battle". and "a coordinated smear campaign". The Office of the United Nations High Commissioner for Human Rights remarked that the sharing of the fraudulent, Israeli-edited version of the video provoked widespread hate speech and dehumanizing rhetoric to be directed on social media against Palestinian demonstrators in general and Al-Najjar in particular.

=== B'Tselem's investigation ===
The investigation conducted by B'Tselem concluded that Israeli soldiers shot al-Najjar deliberately. The group interviewed another paramedic called Rami Abu Jazar, who was at the same protest during which al-Najjar was killed. Jazar told the group that he saw two Israeli soldiers aiming their guns at a group of paramedics, including himself and al-Najjar, "taking a sniper stance". Jazar himself was shot in the knee. No protesters were near the group during the attack, according to him.

B'Tselem wrote:

The IDF Spokesperson tried to clear the military of responsibility for a-Najar's death, initially saying that soldiers did not fire at the spot where she had been standing. Later, the military said a-Najar might have been killed by a ricochet, before finally accusing her of serving as a human shield for rioters. Contrary to the many versions offered by the military, the facts of the case lead to only one conclusion. An investigation conducted by B'Tselem proves 20-year-old a-Najar was fatally shot by a member of the security forces who was aiming directly at her as she was standing about 25 meters away from the fence, despite the fact that she posed no danger to him or anyone else and was wearing a medical uniform.

== U.N. recognition ==
On 2 June 2018, a group of agencies at United Nations in New York City issued a press release expressing their anguish over her death, calling al-Najjar "a clearly identified medical staffer," and stating that the killing of the nurse was "particularly reprehensible". The UN Special Coordinator for the Middle East Peace Process singled her case out for attention, tweeting "Medical workers are #NotATarget!".

On 1 June, a UN Security Council resolution proposed condemning the state of Israel for use of "excessive, disproportionate and indiscriminate force" against Palestinian protesters at the border fence. The resolution was vetoed by the United States.

== Israeli military investigation ==
Israeli military spokespersons responded, but provided no official report on the shooting; they did say that the facts would be investigated. Israel had repeatedly warned that they may kill anyone approaching the fence. The Gazans were calling this a peaceful protest while the Israelis referred to the protests as riots. The protests began 30 March 2018.

On 29 October it was reported that the IDF's military advocate had rejected the findings of the preliminary probe earlier that year that found that she was not shot intentionally. Instead, a criminal investigation into the matter would be opened.

In 2025, in an interview with the journalist Peter Osborne, Alistair Burt, the UK's Minister of State for Middle East and North Africa at the time of the killing, said he was wrong to have trusted Israel to investigate. Burt said "these investigations were effectively useless and used as a cover by the Israelis for the killing".

== New York Times investigation ==
On 30 December 2018, the New York Times together with Forensic Architecture published an in-depth investigative article concerning the killing by utilizing a 3D map to pinpoint the source of the shots fired that resulted in the death. Times reporters collected more than 1,001 pictures of the site on 1 June and crowdsourced 30 cellphone videos to map the movements of the medics at the time of the incident. They also consulted with witnesses, medical officials and Israeli government spokesmen to assess if the shooting was a war crime.

They concluded she was killed by a bullet from 120yds (109m.) away that ricocheted and fragmented from the ground near her. The bullet was "fired by an Israeli sniper into a crowd that included white-coated medics in plain view", and that "neither the medics nor anyone around them posed any apparent threat of violence to Israeli personnel."

Malachy Browne of the Times wrote, "Though Israel claims Rouzan's killing was unintentional, our investigation shows that her shooting appears to have been reckless at best, and possibly a war crime, for which no one has yet been punished."

Ryan Goodman, a New York University professor and expert on the laws of war, told the Times, "The laws of war would not want any military personnel to deliberately fire in the direction of the medics," Mr. Goodman said. "I'm not saying it's close to the line. I'm saying it crosses the line." According to the Times, Israel considers unarmed members of Hamas fair game, "an interpretation of international law that is not universally accepted."

== Commemoration ==
In November on Interstate 93 near Boston, Massachusetts, the Palestine Advocacy Project sponsored a billboard to commemorate al-Najjar. The billboard had the text "Honoring the First Responders of Gaza. Saving Lives. Rescuing Hope" and featured a photograph of al-Najjar. Billboard owner Logan Communications took it down over complaints of terrorism and anti-semitism.

== See also ==
- 2018–19 Gaza border protests
- Human shields in the Israeli–Palestinian conflict
- Mohammed Sobhi al-Judeili
- United Nations General Assembly Resolution ES-10/20
- Iyad Alasttal
- Rafah paramedic massacre
