= Khuzaʽa, Khan Yunis =

Khuza'a
- Municipality type B

Arabic transcription(s)
  - Arabic: خُزاعة
  - Latin: Khuzaa (official)
- Location of Khuza'a within Palestine
- Coordinates: 31°18′25″N 34°21′40″E
- State: State of Palestine
- Governorate: Khan Yunis

Government
  - Type: Municipality
  - Head of Municipality: Shihda Abou-Rouk

Area
  - Total: 7.8 km^{2} (3.0 sq mi)

Population (2017)
  - Total: 11,388
  - Density: 1,500/km^{2} (3,800/sq mi)

Khuza'a (Arabic: خزاعة) is a Palestinian town in the Khan Yunis Governorate in the southern Gaza Strip. According to the Palestinian Central Bureau of Statistics, Khuza'a had a population of 11,388 inhabitants in 2017.

The town of Khuza'a is around 500 metres from the Green Line. It has been repeatedly damaged as a result of the Israeli–Palestinian conflict, most recently during the Gaza war.

== History ==
In the 1945 statistics, Khuza'a (named Khirbat Ikhzaa), had a population of 990, all Muslims, with 8,179 dunams of land, according to an official land and population survey. Of this, 7,987 dunams were used for cereals, while 8 dunams were built-up land. In 1997, the town had a population of 6,787.

=== Allegations of war crimes in the 2008–2009 war ===
The Observer collected allegations from residents that during the 2008–2009 Gaza War, the Israeli military bulldozed houses in Khuza'a with civilians still inside and that civilians were shot despite carrying white flags. B'Tselem collected accounts from residents consistent with what The Observer reported.

Bruno Stevens, a Western journalist who was among the first to get access to Gaza, reported that white phosphorus was used in the shelling of houses. Stevens reported "What I can tell you is that many, many houses were shelled and that they used white phosphorus" and that "it appears to have been indiscriminate".

=== Killings and destruction of most homes in the 2014 war ===
During the 2014 Israel–Gaza conflict, most of the over 500 houses were destroyed when the Israeli military went in with their tanks.

Dozens of civilians were fired on and killed by the Israeli army during the ground offensive, according to human right groups, which some called "apparent violations of the laws of war". Israel dropped leaflets warning civilians to flee, and most did, with only a few hundred remaining. Witnesses said they were used as human shields by Israeli soldiers. Flechette shells were fired on the town, a tactic criticised for endangering civilians as the weapons are imprecise.

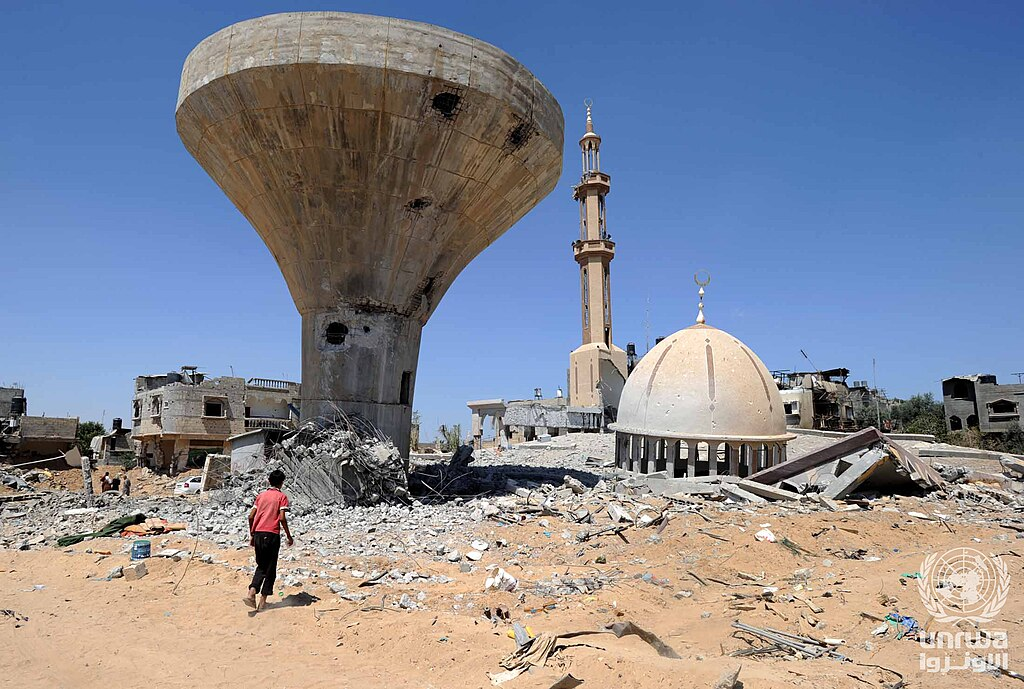
Destruction in Khuzaʽa caused by the 2014 Gaza War

Helsingborgs Dagblad reported that the 5,000 residents fled after warning leaflets were dropped and most took refuge in UNRWA schools. Many residents were trapped because of Israeli shelling. Several Israeli soldiers said they were told Hamas had threatened to kill civilians who left their homes but this was "strongly denied" by more than a dozen residents of the town, who said Israel did not let them leave the fighting. Israeli soldiers said they, per instructions, fired warning shots to anyone who came close to them and then killed if they came closer. They also blamed Hamas' tactics, which they thought "made it impossible to determine who was or was not a threat". These tactics included Hamas fighters waving white flags as though they were civilians. However, more than a dozen of Khuza'a residents, along with many more interviewed by human rights groups, said Israeli soldiers deliberately targeted them and their neighbors while they tried to flee.

In late 2014 there were reports of Israel using herbicide to attack agricultural land around Khuza'a.

=== 2023–2025 Gaza war ===
The town was entirely destroyed in 2025 as a result of the Gaza war. After Israeli army violated the ceasefire in March 2025, it then undertook widespread demolition of buildings in the Gaza Strip. This included Khuza'a where 1,200 buildings demolished between early May and mid-June.

== See also ==
- Rouzan al-Najjar

== Bibliography ==
- Government of Palestine, Department of Statistics (1945). Village Statistics, April, 1945.
- Hadawi, S. (1970). Village Statistics of 1945: A Classification of Land and Area ownership in Palestine. Palestine Liberation Organization Research Center.
