= United Nations Security Council Resolution 1515 =

UN Security Council Resolution 1515
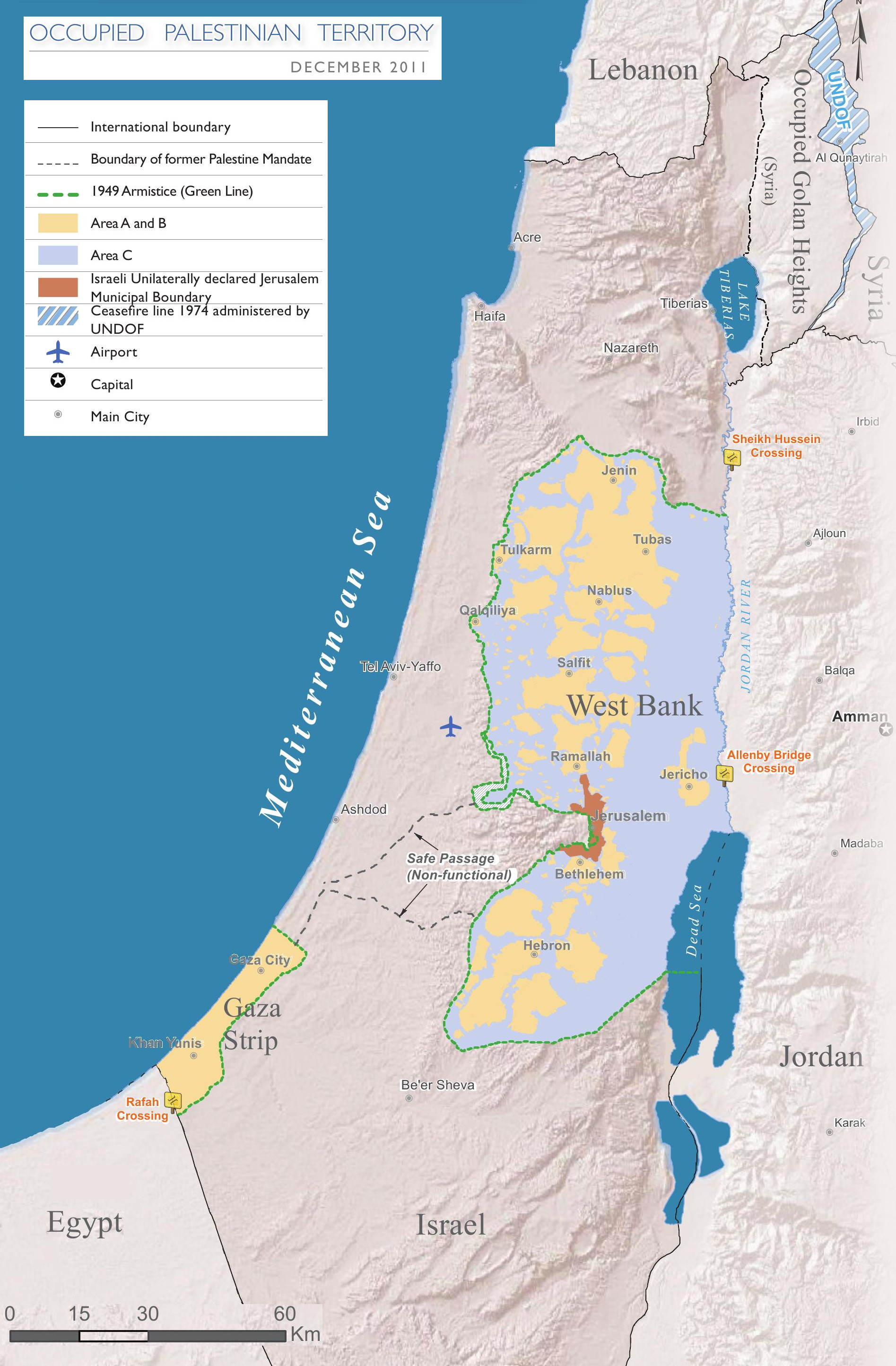
- Israel, Gaza and West Bank
- Date: 19 November 2003
- Meeting no.: 4,862
- Code: S/RES/1515 (Document)
- Subject: The situation in the Middle East, including the Palestinian question
- Voting summary: 15 voted for; None voted against; None abstained
- Result: Adopted

Security Council composition
- Permanent members: China; France; Russia; United Kingdom; United States
- Non-permanent members: Angola; Bulgaria; Chile; Cameroon; Germany; Guinea; Mexico; Pakistan; Spain; Syria

United Nations Security Council resolution 1515, adopted unanimously on 19 November 2003, after recalling all previous resolutions on the situation in the Middle East, particularly resolutions 242 (1967), 338 (1973), 1397 (2002) and the Madrid Principles, the Council endorsed the Road map for peace proposed by the Middle East Quartet in an attempt to resolve the Israeli–Palestinian conflict. The resolution, proposed by Russia, envisaged a Palestinian state by 2005 in return for security guarantees for Israel.

The Security Council expressed concern at the continuing violence in the Middle East, reiterating its demand for an end to hostilities and all acts of terrorism, provocation, incitement and destruction. It envisaged a solution whereby Israel and Palestine exist side by side within recognised borders and solutions to the Israeli–Lebanese and Israeli–Syrian situations.

Welcoming international diplomatic efforts, the resolution called on all parties to fulfil their obligations under the Road map working in co-operation with the Quartet in order to achieve a two-state solution.

== See also ==
- Arab–Israeli conflict
- Israeli–Palestinian conflict
- List of United Nations Security Council Resolutions 1501 to 1600 (2003–2005)
- Second Intifada
