= United Nations Security Council Resolution 1850 =

UN Security Council Resolution 1850
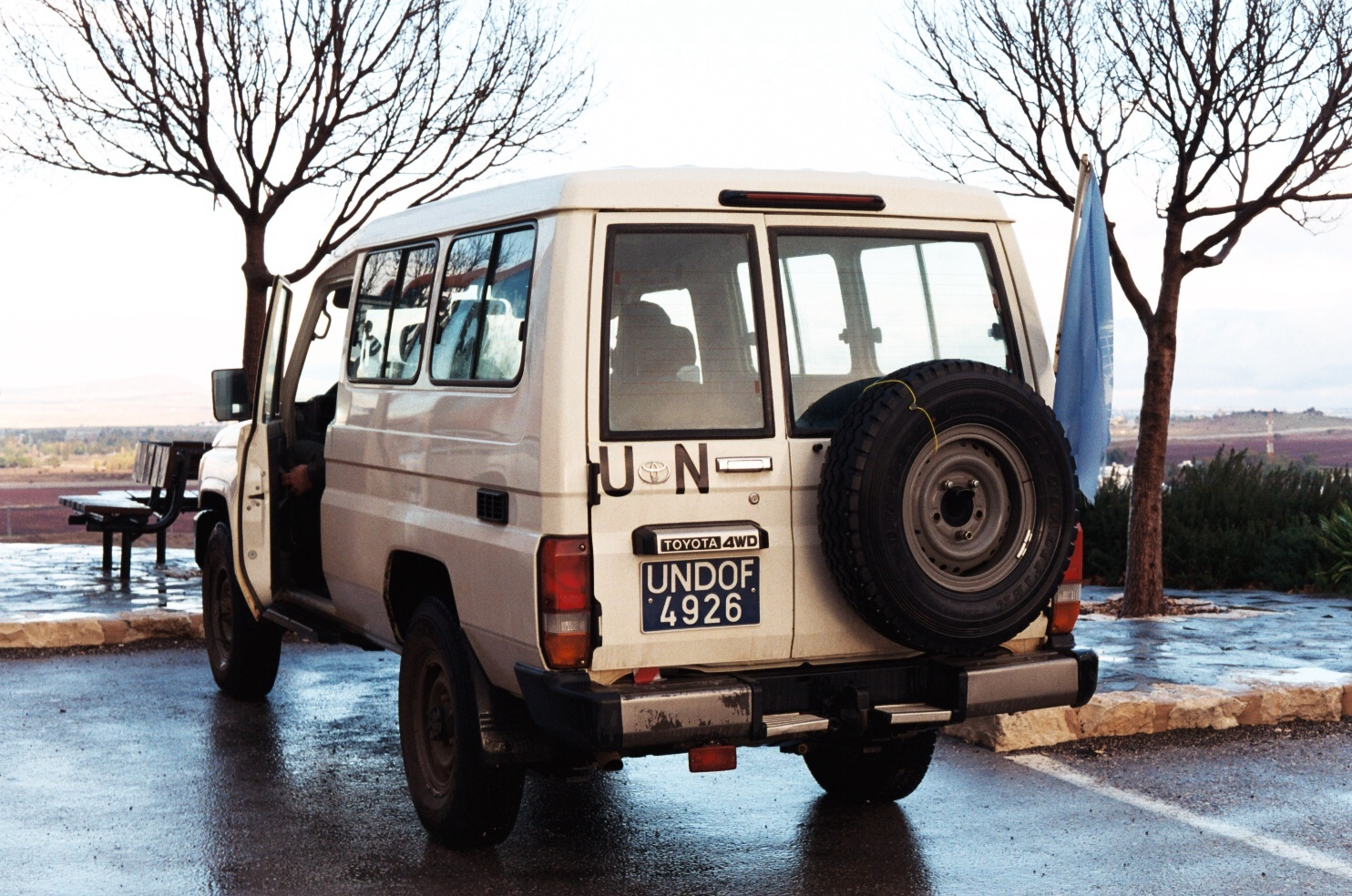
- UNDOF vehicle
- Date: 16 December 2008
- Meeting no.: 6,045
- Code: S/RES/1850 (Document)
- Subject: The situation in the Middle East, including the Palestinian question
- Voting summary: 14 voted for; None voted against; 1 abstained
- Result: Adopted

Security Council composition
- Permanent members: China; France; Russia; United Kingdom; United States
- Non-permanent members: Burkina Faso; Belgium; Costa Rica; Croatia; Indonesia; Italy; Libya; Panama; South Africa; Vietnam

United Nations Security Council Resolution 1850 was adopted on 16 December 2008.

== Resolution ==
Reaffirming its support for the agreements and negotiations resulting from the 2007 Middle East summit in Annapolis, Maryland, the Security Council called on the parties, regional States, and other States and international organizations this morning to intensify their efforts to achieve a two-State solution to the Israeli–Palestinian conflict, as well as peaceful coexistence among all States in the region.

Adopting resolution 1850 (2008) by a vote of 14 to 0 – with Libya abstaining – at the end of a meeting in which four permanent members were represented by ministerial and other high-level officials, the Council declared its commitment to the irreversibility of the ongoing bilateral negotiations between the Israelis and Palestinians, and supported “their determined efforts to reach their goal of concluding a peace treaty resolving all outstanding issues…”.

Toward that end, the Council called on both parties to fulfil their obligations under the Road Map and to refrain from steps that could undermine confidence or prejudice the outcome of the negotiations. It called on States and international organizations to contribute to an atmosphere conducive to negotiations and assist the Palestinian Authority. At the same time, it urged intensified diplomatic efforts to foster “mutual recognition and peaceful coexistence between all States in the region in the context of achieving a comprehensive, just and lasting peace in the Middle East”.

The Council welcomed consideration by the Middle East Diplomatic Quartet – the United Nations, United States, European Union and Russian Federation — in consultation with the parties, of an international meeting in Moscow in 2009.

Before taking action on the text, all Council Members took the floor following the lead of the Quartet principals – Ban Ki-moon, Secretary-General of the United Nations; Condoleezza Rice, Secretary of State of the United States; Sergey Lavrov, Foreign Minister of the Russian Federation; David Miliband, Secretary of State for Foreign and Commonwealth Affairs of the United Kingdom; and the representative of France, which currently holds the Presidency of the European Union.

Secretary-General Ban asked the Council to act today to help “set us firmly, finally and irreversibly on the path to peace in the Middle East” by passing the resolution, acknowledging that after the Annapolis summit, it had been hoped that by now the world would be marking the conclusion of a peace agreement and turning to implementation. “We all regret this is not the case. And we know we still face many hurdles. But a serious process is under way. We must ensure that what has been started is seen all the way through to its conclusion.”

Following Mr. Ban’s remarks, most Council members welcomed the draft resolution, with many stressing the need to maintain the momentum of the Annapolis summit, and others noting that the Council had not acted on the Middle East for nearly five years.

Ms. Rice stressed that the text reaffirmed the Annapolis process as the way forward, as opposed to the kind of brinksmanship that had failed in the past. The text described the contours of the negotiations, defined the role of the international community, confirmed the irreversibility of the bilateral negotiations, and endorsed the parties’ efforts.

Mr. Lavrov said the call for full implementation of commitments under the Road Map was a particularly important part of the text, as was support for a unified Palestinian position. The summit in Moscow had been proposed with the intention to continue that momentum. Mr. Miliband noted that Council resolutions over the years had laid the groundwork for a political settlement of the situation, and it was important now to express determination to make real progress in 2009.

Libya’s representative, however, said Council action had been sparse over the past 60 years, noting that when the 15-member body had pronounced itself, its words had not been translated into deeds. The text contained deliberate ambiguity and did not confront breaches of illegality, which did not serve peace as much as harm it. The aggressor could interpret such texts as acceptance of its practices, and the victim could see them as proof that the international community was biased, thereby promoting further despair and frustration.

The situation in the region since the launch of the Annapolis process had deteriorated further, he said, urging the Council to move quickly to protect civilians facing collective punishment, which constituted a crime against humanity. The minimum conditions conducive to a just solution required a condemnation of such Israeli practices and ending them.

== See also ==
- List of United Nations Security Council Resolutions 1801 to 1900 (2008–2009)
