= United Nations Security Council Resolution 1402 =

UN Security Council Resolution 1402
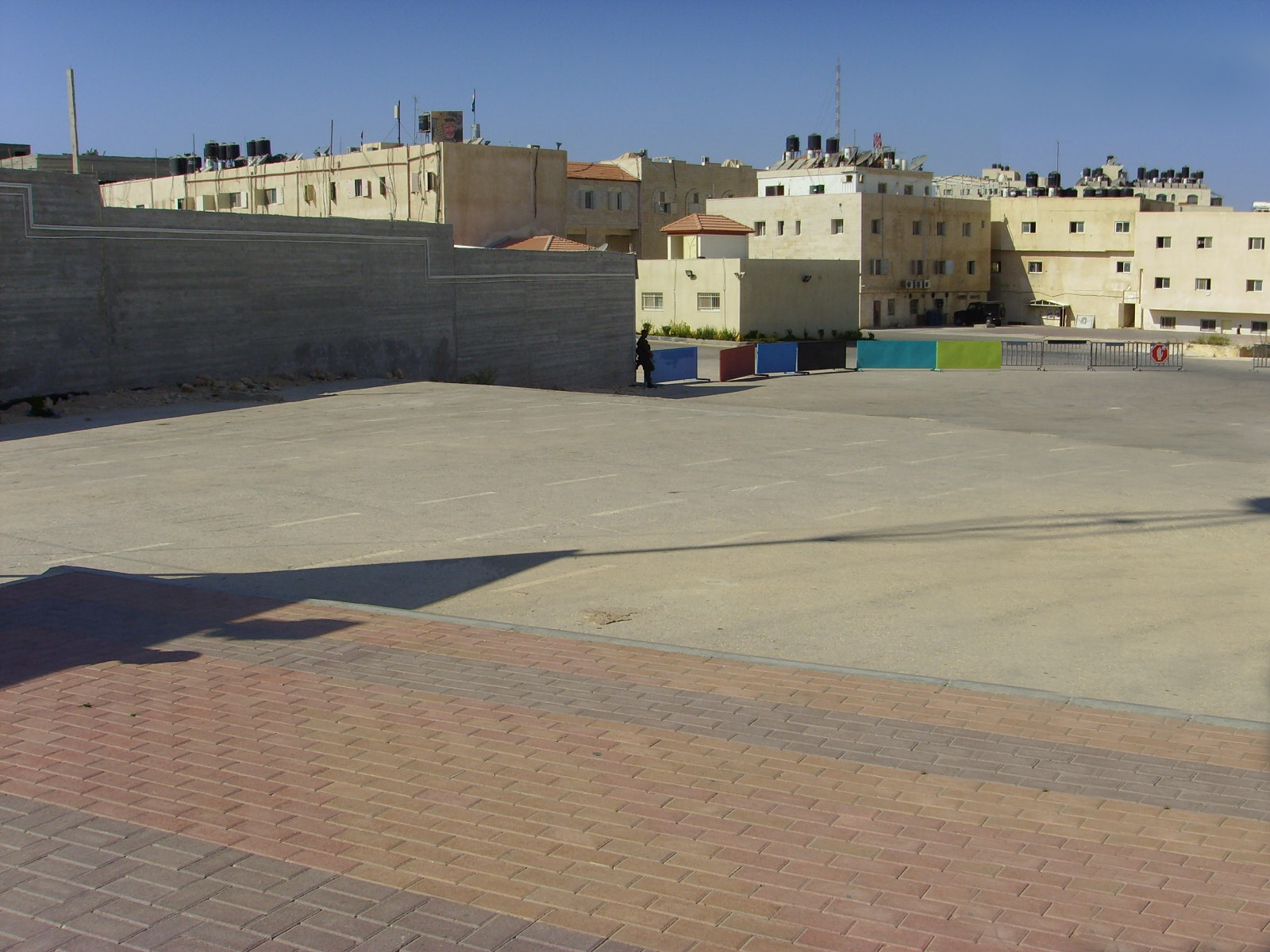
- Compound of the President of the Palestinian National Authority in Ramallah
- Date: 30 March 2002
- Meeting no.: 4,503
- Code: S/RES/1402 (Document)
- Subject: The situation in the Middle East, including the Palestinian question
- Voting summary: 14 voted for; None voted against; None abstained
- Result: Adopted

Security Council composition
- Permanent members: China; France; Russia; United Kingdom; United States
- Non-permanent members: Bulgaria; Cameroon; Colombia; Guinea; Ireland; Mauritius; Mexico; Norway; Singapore; Syria

United Nations Security Council resolution 1402, adopted on 30 March 2002, after recalling resolutions 242 (1967), 338 (1973), 1397 (2002) and the Madrid principles, the Council called for an immediate and meaningful ceasefire between the Israeli and Palestinian during Operation Defensive Shield. It was adopted after 12 hours of consultations.

The Security Council expressed concern at the deterioration of the situation in the region, including suicide bombings in Israel and an attack on the headquarters of the President of the Palestinian Authority. Both sides were urged to move towards a meaningful ceasefire; the withdrawal of Israeli troops from Palestinian cities; and full co-operation with Special Envoy Anthony Zinni and others in the implementation of Tenet security work plan.

The Council reiterated its demand for an immediate cessation of all violence and expressed support for the Secretary-General Kofi Annan and the Special Envoys to the Middle East for efforts to resume the peace process.

Resolution 1402 was adopted by 14 votes in favour and Syria walking out and not participating in the vote, the first time a country had done so in 40 years. The Syrian representative said the text of the resolution was similar to that of Resolution 1397 from which it had abstained in that it refused to condemn Israel and ignored efforts by an Arab countries.

The current resolution was not implemented and Resolution 1403 demanded its implementation.

== See also ==
- Arab–Israeli conflict
- Israeli–Palestinian conflict
- List of United Nations Security Council Resolutions 1401 to 1500 (2002–2003)
- Second Intifada
