= United Nations Security Council Resolution 1403 =

UN Security Council Resolution 1403
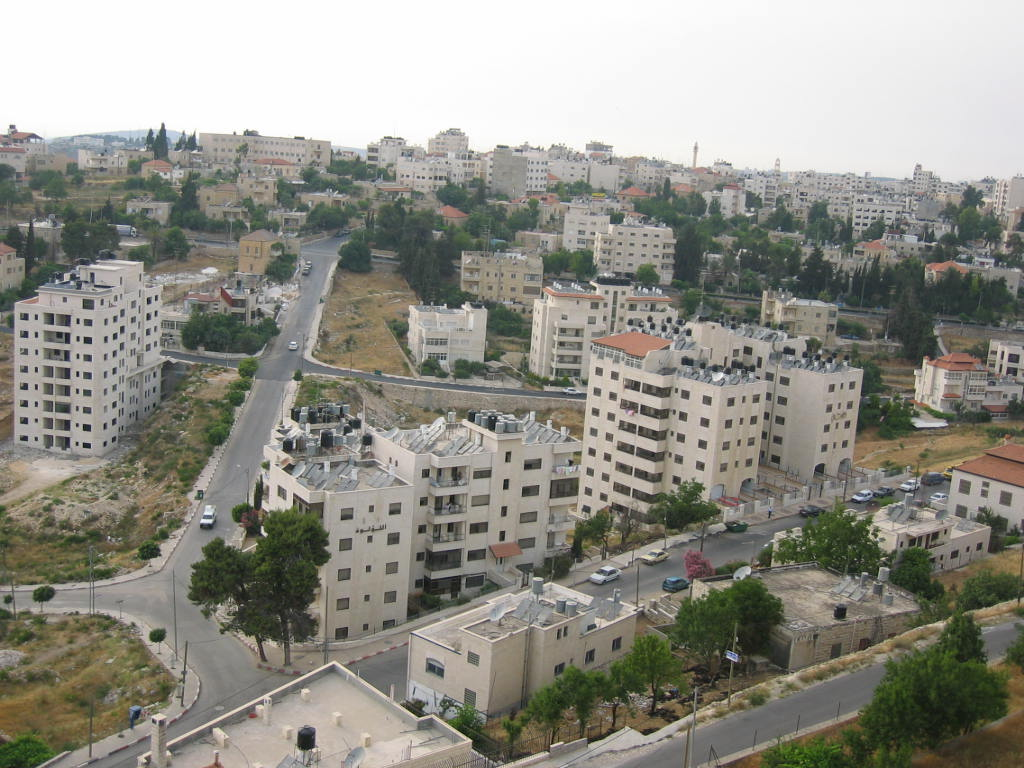
- Residential area in Ramallah
- Date: 4 April 2002
- Meeting no.: 4,506
- Code: S/RES/1403 (Document)
- Subject: The situation in the Middle East, including the Palestinian question
- Voting summary: 15 voted for; None voted against; None abstained
- Result: Adopted

Security Council composition
- Permanent members: China; France; Russia; United Kingdom; United States
- Non-permanent members: Bulgaria; Cameroon; Colombia; Guinea; Ireland; Mauritius; Mexico; Norway; Singapore; Syria

United Nations Security Council resolution 1403, adopted unanimously on 4 April 2002, after recalling resolutions 1397 (2002) and 1402 (2002), the Council demanded the implementation of Resolution 1402 by the Israeli and Palestinian sides.

The Security Council expressed concern at the deteriorating situation on the ground and noted that Resolution 1402 had yet to be implemented. It demanded its immediate implementation and welcomed the visit of the United States Secretary of State Colin Powell to the region and efforts by envoys from Russia, the United States, European Union and United Nations Special Coordinator to bring about a durable resolution to the conflict in the Middle East.

The Secretary-General Kofi Annan was instructed to keep the Council informed on developments in the situation.

== See also ==
- Arab–Israeli conflict
- Israeli–Palestinian conflict
- List of United Nations Security Council Resolutions 1401 to 1500 (2002–2003)
- Operation Defensive Shield
- Second Intifada
