= Palestinian Medical Relief Society =

Palestinian non-governmental non-profit

Palestinian Medical Relief Society جمعية الإغاثة الطبية الفلسطينية (Arabic)
- Formation: 1979
- Type: Non-profit
- Headquarters: al-Bireh
- Region served: State of Palestine
- Website: PMRS

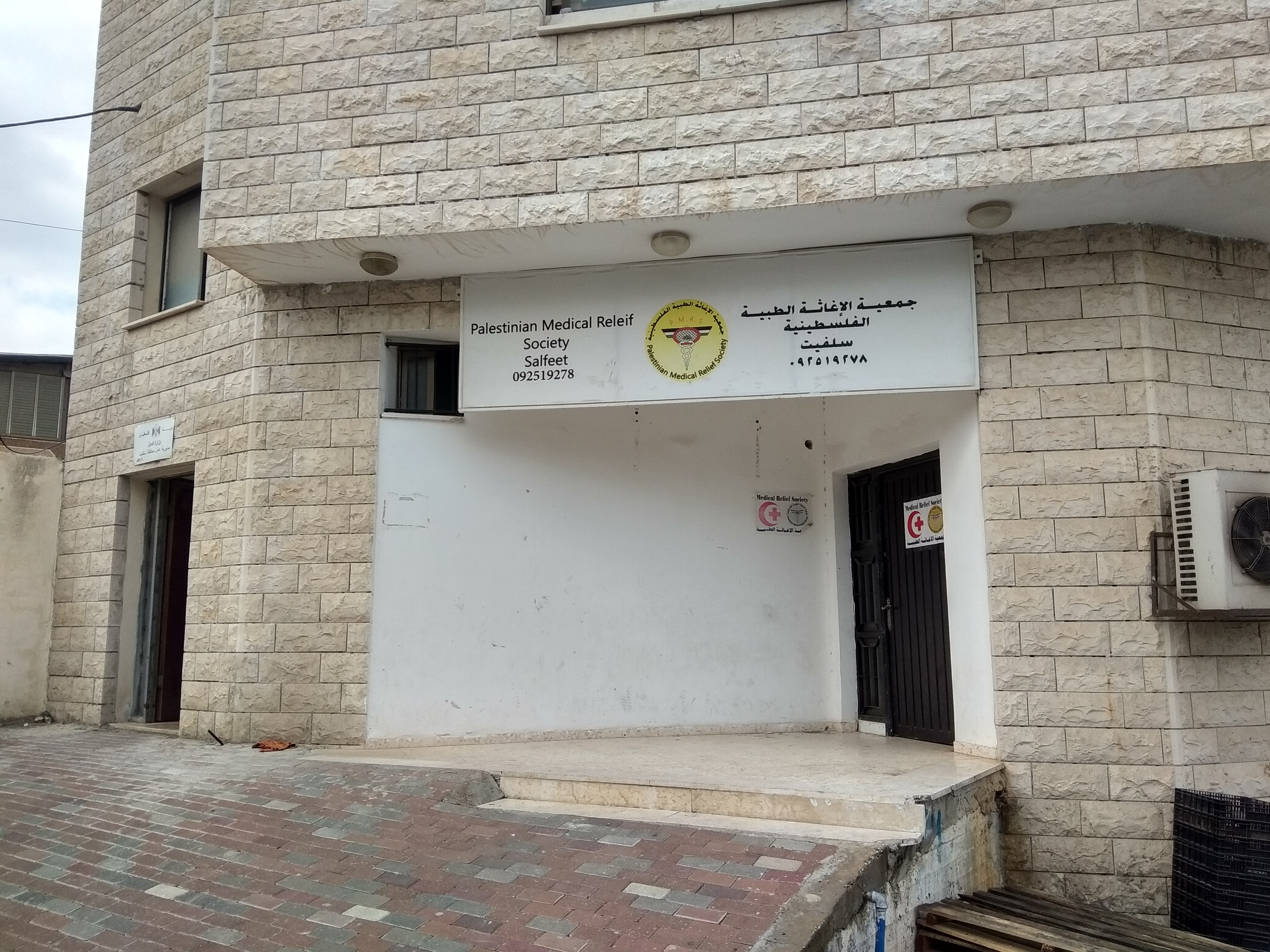
Palestinian Medical Relief Society, Salfit branch 2019

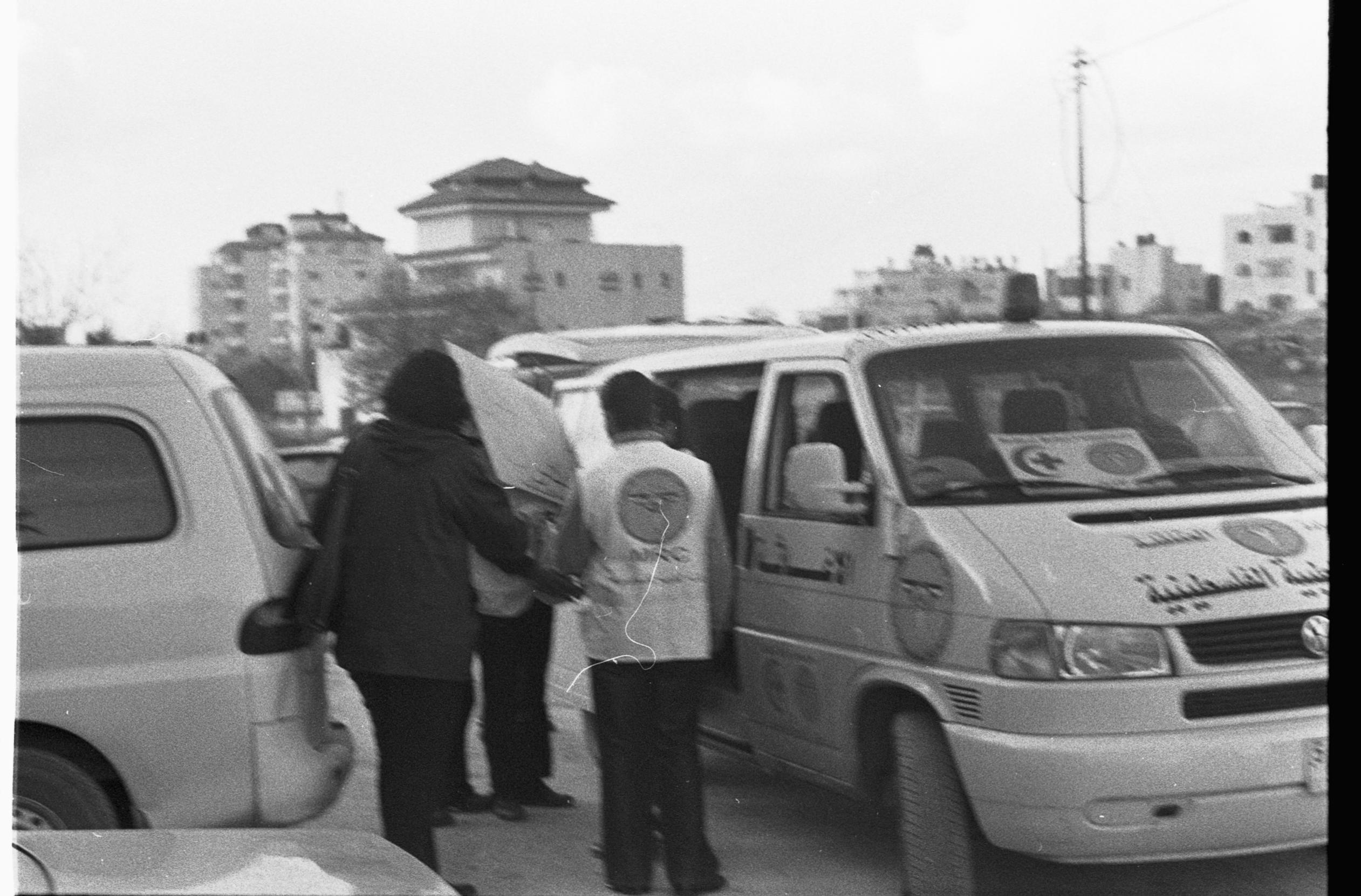
Palestinian Medical Relief Society ambulance, 2008

Palestinian Medical Relief Society (PMRS; Arabic: جمعية الإغاثة الطبية الفلسطينية) a Palestinian non-governmental and non-profit organization, and one of the largest health NGOs in the State of Palestine. It was established in 1979 in the Palestinian territories by a group of healthcare professionals, aiming to provide medical and health services as a result of the deteriorating health situation in Palestine.

== History ==
PMRS was founded in 1979 by a group of Palestinian doctors and healthcare professionals. It was originally called the Union of Palestinian Medical Relief Committees (UPMRC).

In 2008, human rights organizations protested the IDF arrest of two PMRS paramedics while they were on duty transporting patients through the entrance of the Al-Watan government hospital.

In 2018, PMRS established mobile health clinics in the West Bank with funding from Medico International.

In 2020, four PMRS volunteers were arrested in Jerusalem for handing out pamphlets raising awareness about the COVID-19 pandemic.

In 2025, multiple PMRS clinics, as well as the organization's administrative headquarters, were bombed by Israeli forces. PMRS, as well as related organizations such as the People's Health Movement, claimed these attacks deliberately targeted civilians and healthcare facilities.

== Locations ==
PMRS centers are spread over 490 locations spread over West Bank and Gaza Strip cities, villages, and camps. Its headquarters are located in Al Bireh, Ramallah, State of Palestine.

== Services ==
PMRS provides medical services such as primary healthcare, laboratory services, pharmacy, women's health services, child healthcare, counseling, and health education.

Since 2023, PMRS has established health service points (HSPs) to provide emergency medical services to the wounded and sick in areas impacted by the Gaza War.

== See also ==
- Palestine Red Crescent Society
- Health care in the Palestinian territories
- Killing of Rouzan al-Najjar
