= United Nations Security Council Resolution 1397 =

UN Security Council Resolution 1397
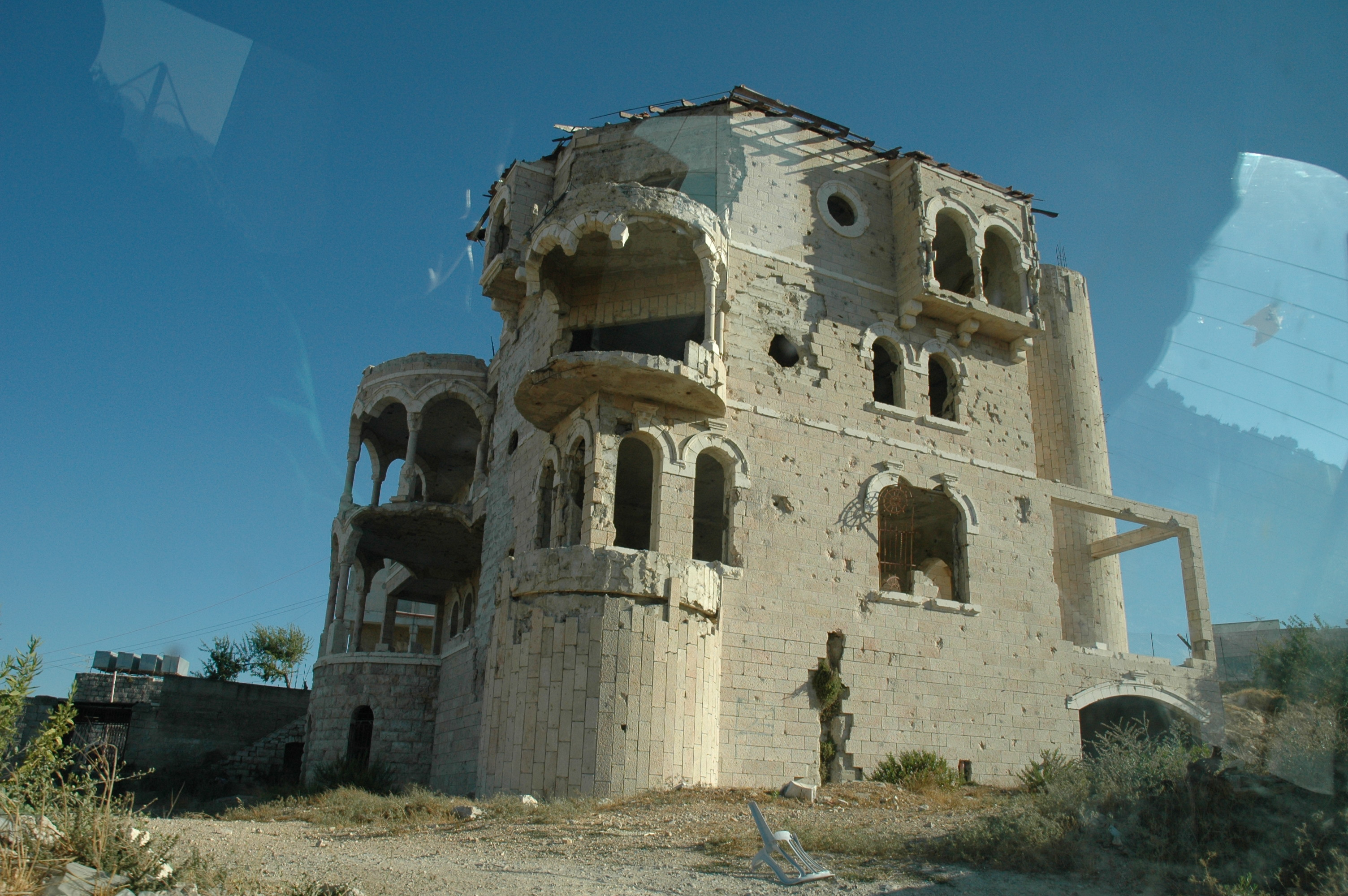
- Shelled building in the Palestinian Authority territories
- Date: 12 March 2002
- Meeting no.: 4,489
- Code: S/RES/1397 (Document)
- Subject: The situation in the Middle East, including the Palestinian question
- Voting summary: 14 voted for; None voted against; 1 abstained
- Result: Adopted

Security Council composition
- Permanent members: China; France; Russia; United Kingdom; United States
- Non-permanent members: Bulgaria; Cameroon; Colombia; Guinea; Ireland; Mauritius; Mexico; Norway; Singapore; Syria

United Nations Security Council resolution 1397 was a resolution adopted on 12 March 2002 by the United Nations Security Council. The Council demanded an end to the violence that had taken place between the Israeli and Palestinian sides since September 2000 (Second Intifada). It was the first Security Council resolution to call for a two-state solution to the conflict.

Before the adoption of the resolution, the Secretary-General Kofi Annan had called on Palestinians to end "morally repugnant" acts of terror and suicide bombings and on Israelis to end their illegal occupation of Palestinian territory and use of excessive force.

== Resolution ==
=== Observations ===
The Security Council affirmed the vision of Israeli and Palestinian states existing side by side with secure and recognised borders. It expressed concern at events that had taken place since September 2000 in the region and the need for all to ensure the safety of civilians and respect for international humanitarian law. The Council welcomed efforts by the United States, Russia, European Union, Saudi Crown Prince Abdullah and others to bring about a just and lasting peace in the Middle East.

=== Acts ===
The resolution demanded the immediate cessation of violence, terror, incitement, provocation and destruction, calling upon the Israeli and Palestinian sides to co-operate in the implementation of the Tenet work plan and Mitchell Report. Finally, the efforts of Kofi Annan and others to resume the peace process and end violence were commended.

=== Text of the resolution ===
"The Security Council,

"Recalling all its previous relevant resolutions, in particular resolutions 242 (1967) and 338 (1973),

"Affirming a vision of a region where two States, Israel and Palestine, live side by side within secure and recognized borders,

"Expressing its grave concern at the continuation of the tragic and violent events that have taken place since September 2000, especially the recent attacks and the increased number of casualties,

"Stressing the need for all concerned to ensure the safety of civilians,

"Stressing also the need to respect the universally accepted norms of international humanitarian law,

"Welcoming and encouraging the diplomatic efforts of special envoys from the United States of America, the Russian Federation, the European Union and the United Nations Special Coordinator and others to bring about a comprehensive, just and lasting peace in the Middle East,

"Welcoming the contribution of Saudi Crown Prince Abdullah,

"1. Demands immediate cessation of all acts of violence, including all acts of terror, provocation, incitement and destruction;

"2. Calls upon the Israeli and Palestinian sides and their leaders to cooperate in the implementation of the Tenet work plan and Mitchell Report recommendations with the aim of resuming negotiations on a political settlement;

"3. Expresses support for the efforts of the Secretary-General and others to assist the parties to halt the violence and to resume the peace process;

"4. Decides to remain seized of the matter".

=== Votes ===
Resolution 1397 was adopted by 14 votes to none against and one abstention from Syria, whose representative felt that the resolution did not address the concerns of Arab countries.

== See also ==
- Arab–Israeli conflict
- Israeli–Palestinian conflict
- List of United Nations Security Council Resolutions 1301 to 1400 (2000–2002)
- Second Intifada
