= Mahasen al-Khateeb =

Palestinian artist (1993–2024)

- Born: 1993
- Died: 18 October 2024 (aged 30–31); Jabalia refugee camp, Gaza Strip, Palestine

Mahasen Al-Khateeb (1993 – 18 October 2024) was a Palestinian freelance artist, specialising in illustration and character design. She came to prominence during the Israeli invasion of Gaza. During this difficult period of war, she used visual art to depict the ordeal and horrors undergone during the Israeli military campaign, disseminate the Palestinian cause and advocate for human rights.

== Artistic vocation ==
Two weeks before the October 7 attacks in 2023, she invested all her savings in a studio, where she strived to get some professional independence. However, the studio was destroyed in Gaza war. She used whatever income she obtained to support her family. She also provided free online courses for other Palestinians who aspired to progress in artistic creation.

Regarded as a talented artist, she conveyed strong narratives related to the harsh war realities facing, often by means of social media. Israel authorities suppressed virtually all Internet connectivity in Gaza, for which she often relied on social media, like Instagram, to disseminate her artistic production. Al-Khateeb collaborated with many Arab agents and international institutions.

She designed her last work, entitled Tell me what you're feeling when you see anybody burning, in memory of Shaban al-Dalu, a 19-year-old burned to death in the Israeli bombing of al-Aqsa Hospital days earlier. She died shortly after hit by Israel shelling in her neighbourhood.

== Legacy ==
The Lucca Comics & Games Festival posthumously awarded her a special mention.

In the Basque Country, multiple unions, including ELA, LAB, UGT, and CCOO called meetings in Pamplona, Donostia, Bilbao and Vitoria-Gasteiz to denounce her death, pay tribute, and demand an end to the Gaza genocide. Student associations also organized gatherings in Basque educational and academic establishments. Al-Khateeb collaborated with the pro-Palestine association Gernika-Palestina.
