= University of Gaza =

University of Gaza may refer to:

- Islamic University of Gaza
- Al-Azhar University – Gaza
