= Amal Syam =

Amal Syam may refer to:

- Amal Syam (activist) (born 1969), Palestinian women's rights advocate
- Amal Syam (Hamas member) (born 1962), Palestinian member of Hamas
