= Fadi Elhusseini =

Palestinian-Canadian diplomat and writer

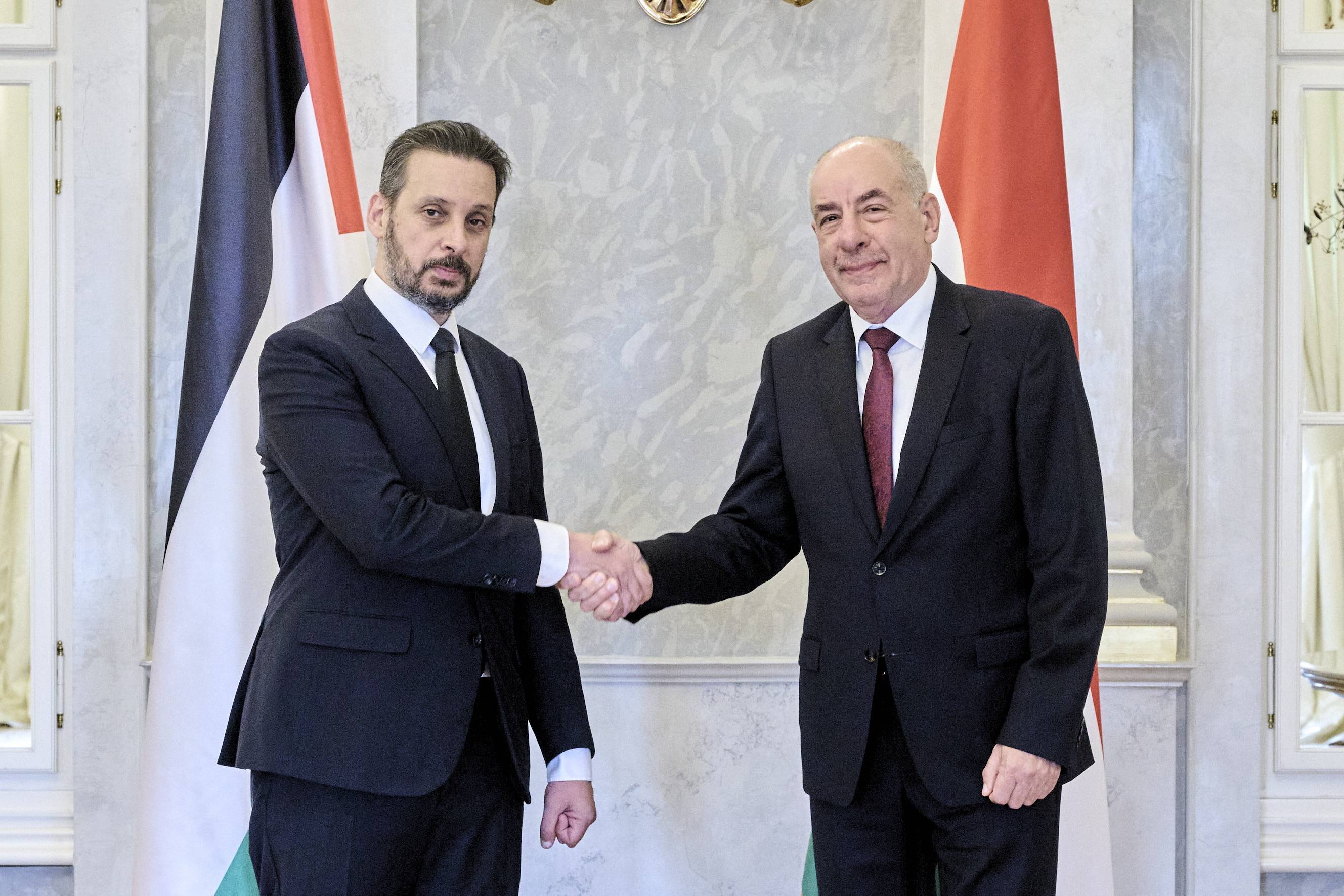
- Elhusseini with Hungarian President Tamás Sulyok
- Born: 21 October 1975 (age 51); Gaza, Palestine
- Education: Cairo University; University of Salento; University of Sunderland
- Occupations: Diplomat; writer; columnist

Fadi Faisal Elhusseini (Arabic: فادي الحسيني) is a Palestinian politician and writer, who was born in 1975. He has served as the Ambassador of the State of Palestine to Hungary since 2020.

== Early life ==
Elhusseini is a political and media expert, Board Member of the Institute for Middle East Studies in Canada. He served as the Director of the Bureau of Palestinian Minister of Foreign Affairs, and previously was the Executive Director of the Palestinian Council on Foreign Relations. In addition, he worked as a lecturer at Al-Azhar University in Gaza. He administrated an office of a project funded by the United States Agency for International Development.

Elhusseini presented television programs on Palestine TV and worked as a columnist for a London-based news agency. He made contributions and wrote articles for a number of Arab and Western newspapers, magazines and journals dealing with issues such as the Palestinian conflict, politics and international relations in the Middle East and the Arab Spring. He contributed with one chapter in a book on Turkish-Canadian relations. Moreover, his articles were published in newspapers in Turkey, Norway, France, the United Kingdom, Canada, the United States, Russia, Belgium, South Africa, Pakistan, Indonesia, Egypt, Jordan, Lebanon, Iraq, Iran and Palestine. His works have been published in English, French, Italian and Arabic, and articles and publications have been translated into Turkish, Persian and Russian.

He gave lectures on the Palestinian-Israeli conflict and developments in the Middle East, and participated in academic conferences in Poland, the UK, Italy, the US and Canada. Additionally, he speaks a number of foreign languages.

== Background and Education ==
Fadi Faisal Hamdi Abdulrahman Ahmed Mohiuddin Elhusseini was born on 21 October 1975 in Gaza. His father, Faisal Elhusseini, is a lawyer in Palestine, who has been arrested twice by Israeli authorities. And his grandfather, Hamdi Elhusseini, is a Palestinian intellectual.

He earned a Bachelor's degree in Economics and Political Science from the Faculty of Economics and Political Science - Cairo University. In 2000, he received a Master's degree with honors from the University of Salento (formerly called: Università degli Studi di Lecce) in Italy. In October 2012, he began his Ph.D. studies at the University of Sunderland, the UK. His thesis deals with the role of Turkey in the Arab world in the aftermath of the so-called Arab Spring. He received his Ph.D. in international relations. He also earned his Master's degree in international trade law and policy in Italy.

== Diplomatic career ==
Elhusseini has served as the Ambassador of the State of Palestine to Hungary since 2020, succeeding Dr. Manuel Sarkis Hassassian.

In 2025, during Israeli Prime Minister Benjamin Netanyahu's visit to Hungary, Elhusseini criticised the Hungarian government for not arresting Netanyahu, who has an ICC arrest warrant against him for his military action in Gaza.

== Articles ==
- The New Taste of September – 6 September 2001
- Abbasid Power and Hamas Governance – 17 April 2006
- Their Siege and Our Unity – 12 May 2006
- The Flood and the Muslim Brotherhood – 10 June 2006
- The Land of Blood the Barbaric Media – 15 June 2006
- Tear of a Fighter – 23 July 2006
- Are These the Times of the Knights? – 2 August 2006
- The Lebanese War: Lessons Learned – 12 August 2006
- Let's Always Bet on Ourselves – 20 November 2006
- Let's First Understand the Consequences – 6 December 2006
- Unique is the Palestinian Political System – 24 December 2006
- Mecca Blast – 27 March 2007
- Major Shifts and Great Challenges – 12 April 2007
- Lawlessness of Democracy – 8 May 2007
- What's Next!! – 4 August 2007
- We Need to Decide, Now – 16 August 2007
- The Struggle with Illusions in Talks of Peace – 5 November 2007
- The Jewish State vs. The Right of Return – 17 November 2007
- The State of Promises – 3 December 2007
- The Choice Is Yours, Palestine – 7 March 2008
- The Extreme Heat of Winter – 14 March 2008
- Beyond Negotiations – 12 April 2008
- Sixty Years of Eternity – 13 May 2008
- Discussion, Negotiations, Appeasement and Disengagement – 19 July 2008
- The Loss of a Nation and the Dying Cause – 30 August 2008
- How Do They Determine Their Destiny? – 16 January 2012
- The Palestinian Choice – 20 January 2012
- The Israeli Concept of Safety and Security: Between Strengthening the Blockade and Building the Wall – May 2012
- The Art of Palestinian Resistance – 27 November 2012
- Israel's Airstrike on Syria – 2 February 2013
- Will Israel Attack Iran? – 8 March 2013
- A New Spring: The Middle East Between the History of Revolutions and Nation's Future – 14 April 2013
- The New Arab Revolutions: A Conspiracy Theory or The Will of a Nation? – 15 May 2013
- The Middle East is Dying
- Will Erdogan Visit Gaza?
- Hidden Conflicts in the Events in the Arab Region
- The Syria Strike: The Mask Falling
- Arab Countries: A New Regional Order Has Just Emerged
- ISIS's Ambitions: Between the Permitted and the Ordained
- The Middle East: Stars Fall and Powers Rise
- Hamas's Diplomatic Activity: Strategies Changing and Building New Alliances
- Has Everyone Lost Their Way?
- Even If He Wants To, Can Netanyahu Make Peace?
- The Syrian Tunnel: Chaos to Hijack the Arab Spring or to Scatter the Leaves?
- Protective Edge: A Military Tool for Political Purposes
- The Palestinian Reconciliation: Regional Dimensions and International Implications
- Israel: Between the Illusory Peace Talk and the Dangers of Virtual Presence

== Research Papers and Other Publications ==
- A research on economic development and environmental degradation.
- A research on investment laws in Egypt.
- A research paper on fostering the role of Palestinian communities abroad.
- A research paper on the history of Arab revolutions and geopolitical future.
- A policy paper on Turkish-Canadian relations.
- A research paper on democracy in the Arab world.
- A research paper on the Arab Spring, its causes and mechanisms.
- A policy paper on Turkish foreign policy towards the Arab world.
- A research paper on World War I, the Ottoman Empire and the Middle East.
- A research paper on the future of European role in the Arab world following the Arab spring.
