= The Omar Herz Show =

Palestinian Instagram creators

Instagram information
- Page: Mohammed and Omar Show
- Years active: 2024–2025
- Followers: 1,300,000 (July 6, 2026)

The Omar Herz Show is an Instagram account in which Palestinian friends Omar Shareed and Mohammed Herzallah documented their daily lives during the Gaza war. The account quickly garnered millions of followers and received attention from media sources.

In August 2024, they were ranked #17 at Rolling Stone's list of "25 Most Influential Creators of 2024", with Steffi Cao noting that the friends "have shared a perspective that no other media outlet would be able to offer, recording the smallest details of how civilians adapt and survive."

They were friends with fellow Palestinian creator Medo Halimy, who died in August 2024 following an Israeli airstrike.

== History ==
Shareed and Herzallah met in school in Gaza City, but weren't much close back then. They had just gotten into college (Herzallah in Engineering and Shareed in Economics or Business Administration) when Israel started bombing Gaza in response to the October 7 attacks.

Herzallah's family left their house and belongings and took shelter in a stranger's apartment while Shareed's family (a younger and an older brother, one of them sick and dependent on medication that requires refrigeration, and his mother, a journalist and Al-Aqsa University graduate) fled to Nuseirat first and then Deir al-Balah, where they became good friends after learning that they were the only ones from their school group there.

In April 2024, at the ages of 18 (Shareed) and 19 (Herzallah), they began to document their daily routine in war and reached the 1,5 follower mark on Instagram in two months and 1,6 million in three. The pair started to share videos as they evacuated from one survival tent to the next one. As they approached the Egypt–Gaza border, they acquired an eSIM with which they were able to start editing and uploading videos, with the initial intention to promote their eSIM sales business. The pair then set out to reconnect their community with the internet so there would be an escape from the usually negative news on their area while also investing in the business to finance further evacuations and family expenses and founding the Karawan Chess Club for displaced children (with their friend Mustafa Saleh, then 17), which eventually secured sponsorship from Chess.com.

The videos also depicted them organizing football matches, connecting fellow Palestinians with additional eSIMs, and cooking with limited resources and ingredients sold at inflated prices, besides other everyday activities. Their works, in English, were usually titled "daily routine in war zone" and they would often appear wearing football jerseys.

On 13 December 2024, Shareed was accepted into Dartmouth College. In a previous attempt, he spent the 2023 New Year's Eve struggling to finish his Common Application and tried to cross around 20 kilometers of war zone on foot to the nearest region where his eSIM would work in order to complete it, all while staying hidden from his mother, who prohibited him from risking his life like that. He gave up halfway. The successful application was built on a 2022 failed one and improved and revised with the help of a friend. After receiving the approval, Shareed connected with fellow students and received help leaving the country via a Change.org campaign that connected him to an unknown humanitarian agency. After a three-month journey through Khan Yunis, the Kerem Shalom border crossing, and Boston, he finally arrived in Hanover. Prior to this campaign, they had also started another fundraiser in GoFundMe in order to cover the 5,000 dollar price to leave the Gaza Strip. Shareed also used the Instagram page to post his struggles in making it to Dartmouth.

According to Shareed's LinkedIn profile, the page was active from May 2024 to January 2025.

== Impact ==
In her Master's thesis for Ca' Foscari University of Venice, Chiara Guarino analyzed that the duo uses social media to "share their experiences and perspectives, offering an alternative view to the dominant narrative, which does not invite them to speak about what they are experiencing firsthand. Their videos [...] have a global impact and allow the vast audiences of TikTok, Instagram, and YouTube to access stories and images that would otherwise remain invisible." She also commented that they "not only raise awareness of the impact of the conflict on the lives of young Palestinians, allowing their viewers to form an empathetic connection through the common ground of social networks and discursive practices, but also create a space for self-representation, contributing to a more nuanced and personal understanding of what it means to live in a war zone" and "drawing attention to the structural difficulties and everyday effects of the occupation, but also to the community’s ability to maintain a normal life despite everything." She also said that they "portray the human and personal side of their lives, allowing viewers to perceive the current reality of Palestine through everyday experiences and moments of normality."

In a story for NBC News about Palestinian creators during war, Daysia Tolentino and Marin Scott commented that accounts like Omar Herz Show "give an alternative view of survival in Gaza that is personal and more algorithm-friendly compared to more graphic content" and that content produced by local journalists is often flagged as graphic or sensitive, "which can often result in the content’s being limited or removed on Instagram and TikTok."

Timothy Laurie from the University of Technology Sydney Faculty of Arts and Social Sciences argues that their narrative helps the audience move from a mere empathetic perspective to a more understanding position towards Palestine as a nation as complex as any other. He also analyzed that because mainstream media usually emphasizes the high number of women and children killed in the war, the general public may view the deaths of men as "acceptable", but the pair shows that even grown up men can also be victims of the state of war. Ayesha Jehangir from the University of New South Wales commented that contents such as the ones posted by the account shorten the distance between facts and the general public.

Writing for De Correspondent, Valentijn De Hingh compared the duo's chronicles with Libelle's coverage during World War II, in the sense that people's concerns during and before war did not differ so much, and the impacts of war were present in a more discrete manner among the texts.

Marloes Geboers, from the University of Amsterdam, commented that the fact that the two friends are influenced by Western culture "makes them relatable and fosters sympathy among a wider audience". She also said that social media reshaped people's perception of war because "traditional press photography captures the intensity of war but also creates a sense of distance. The short-form video format offered by Instagram radically changes how we view the war. As a viewer, you are immersed in their world; it feels as though you are walking alongside the boys."
