= Killing of Shaban al-Dalou =

2024 killing in Gaza war

- Part of the Al-Aqsa Hospital massacre and Gaza war
- Location: Shuhada al-Aqsa Hospital, Deir al-Balah, Gaza Strip, Palestine
- Date: 14 October 2024
- Attack type: Death by burning
- Victims: Shaban al-Dalou, aged 19
- Perpetrator: Israel Defense Forces

Shaban al-Dalou was a 19-year-old Palestinian man from the Gaza Strip who was killed during the bombing of Al-Aqsa hospital in Deir al-Balah, Gaza by the Israel Defense Forces on 14 October 2024. The area had been designated as a part of a "humanitarian zone" and as a result was densely populated with patients as well as refugees who had set up camps around the hospital. Israeli officials said they believed the tents around the hospital were probably ignited by secondary explosions.

Shaban's story gained widespread attention when a video began to circulate online of Shaban lying on a bed, with his leg trapped, burning alive. Shaban's mother was also burned alive in the fire. Shaban's younger siblings and father were also severely burned in the attack. A few days after the attack, on 17 October 2024, Shaban's younger brother, 11-year old Abdul Rahman al-Dalou, died after succumbing to the severe burns. Shaban's younger sister, Farah al-Dalou, also died a few days later, on 22 October, as a result of the severe burns she had suffered from the attack.

== Life ==
Shaban was born on 16 October 2004. He had two brothers and two sisters. According to his mother, he had memorized the Quran by heart. In the final university qualifying exam, Tawjihi, Shaban scored 97.9%. He started studying software engineering at Al-Azhar University in Gaza in September 2023. Shaban loved to play Pro Evolution Soccer and FIFA on the PlayStation. He was also an avid lover of football, playing with his friends at Gaza's five-a-side courts. He was a Real Madrid fan and his favourite player was Karim Benzema. Shaban's favorite food was vegetable pizza from Al-Taboon Restaurant in Gaza City. Shaban applied to universities in the UK, Ireland, and Qatar with the intent to continue his studies.

Prior to arriving at Al-Aqsa hospital, Shaban and his family had been displaced six times. Shaban's father was a taxi driver and his mother was a babysitter. After their home was bombed by the IDF, Shaban started a GoFundMe page to raise funds for his family to evacuate from Gaza. As the eldest of five siblings, Shaban was the primary earner for his family, starting a falafel stand near the hospital. He had also erected the tent in which his family was staying. A week prior to his killing, Shaban survived the IDF's bombing of the Shuhada al-Aqsa mosque and was transferred to Al-Aqsa hospital to receive treatment.

== Reactions ==
Shaban's death was viewed around the world by millions of people, prompting outrage and adding to concerns about Israel's conduct in Gaza.

=== Family ===
- Shaban's father stated, "My son was being burned in front of me".
- Shaban's younger brother stated he had wanted to go into the flames to try and rescue his brother, but others injured in the fire held him back, fearing he would be killed as well: "I was screaming for someone to let me go, but in vain… My brother’s leg was trapped and he couldn’t free himself. I think you saw it in the video. He was raising his hand. That was my brother. He was my support in this world. ... I saw my brother burning in front of me, and my mother too. What more do you need, and you stay silent? You see us burning, and you stay silent."

=== Israeli ===
On 18 October 2024, Israeli government spokesman and former director of Labour Friends of Israel David Mencer was interviewed on LBC by presenter Ben Kentish, who asked Mencer for an explanation of the circumstances surrounding Shaban's death. Mencer said the video footage of Shaban's death was fabricated and an example of Pallywood: "This story in particular, I have seen, I have seen with my own eyes, of this being fabricated, of models being used, of these sorts of stories being created, fabricated so that it will encourage world outrage."

=== Public figures ===
- Cori Bush, US Representative: "There are no words powerful enough to capture the agony of human beings being massacred & burned alive. The U.S. is funding & arming the Israeli military's extermination of the Palestinian people. It's unconscionable."
- Sonny Bill Williams, New Zealand rugby player: "They're burning people alive but some of you are still scared to speak out"
- Ione Belarra, first secretary general of Unidas Podemos, exhibited photographs of Shaban al-Dalou in life and another one burning, demanding that prime minister of Spain Pedro Sánchez impose an arms embargo on Israel.
- Omar Suleiman, American scholar: "His name was Shaaban. He was loved by his family and friends, a memorizer of the Quran. He's named after the month that in the Islamic tradition is referred to as the forgotten month. Let him never be forgotten."
- Roger Waters, English musician: "I've just watched the video of the young man burning in the tent…Israel is a disgusting genocidal state beyond anything"
- United Nations Children's Fund: "Today, our screens were once again filled with horrifying reports of children killed, burned, and families emerging from bombed tents in Gaza. These should shock the world to its core."
