= Amal Syam (activist) =

Palestinian women's rights advocate

Amal Nemer Hassan Syam
- آمال صيام
- Born: October 16, 1969 (age 56); Gaza City, Gaza Strip
- Education: MBA (Human Resource Management), Al‑Azhar University, Gaza
- Years active: 1992–present
- Employer(s): Women's Affairs Center (WAC), Gaza
- Known for: Women's rights advocacy, leadership in Gaza women‑led civil society
- Title: General director (executive director)

Amal Syam (Arabic: آمال صيام) is a Palestinian women's rights advocate and the General Director of the Women's Affairs Center (WAC) in Gaza. She is involved in advancing gender equality, women's empowerment, and inclusive participation in policy processes in Palestine.

== Early life and education ==
Syam was born on October 16, 1969, in Gaza City. She holds a Master's degree in Business administration, with a specialization in Human resource management, from Al-Azhar University in Gaza.

== Career ==
Since 2009, Syam has served as General Director of the Women's Affairs Center in Gaza. In this role, she oversees the organization's strategic planning, program implementation, gender-focused research, community engagement, and advocacy efforts.She has led initiatives aimed at addressing harmful gender norms and socio-cultural practices, including efforts to combat gender-based violence. Under her leadership, WAC has implemented response services such as psychosocial support, legal aid, economic assistance, and case management for women and girls in vulnerable conditions. Syam has also supported programs that promote economic empowerment, including access to wage employment, small business management, and digital freelancing opportunities for women.

Syam has also commented publicly on ceasefire implications and humanitarian conditions in Gaza in various interviews and international platforms. During the escalation of hostilities in the Gaza Strip from late 2023 onwards, Syam continued to lead the Women's Affairs Center despite multiple personal displacements and damage to the organization's main office in Gaza City. The Center opened a new office in Rafah to serve approximately 1.5 million displaced persons. Before the conflict, the Center employed 100 staff members and assisted more than 170,000 people annually. During the war, the organization provided humanitarian assistance including psychological support, legal counselling, cash assistance, and distribution of hygiene and dignity kits. Syam emphasized the critical need for funding to women's organizations, noting that only 0.09% of funding for the 2023 Flash Appeal went directly to national or local women's rights organizations.

Her professional approach is grounded in principles of human rights, gender-transformative development, community engagement, environmental awareness, and disability inclusion. As a trainer and facilitator, Syam has conducted workshops on leadership, strategic planning, early marriage, gender-based violence, life skills, and project management working with staff from civil society organizations and youth groups as well as humanitarian professionals. She has spoken about the importance of combatting early marriage traditions to allow for the healthy psychosocial development of girls.

=== Human rights work under genocide ===
The work of human rights defenders like Amal is described as "vital" by UN Special Rapporteur Mary Lawlor. Carrying out such work while trying to survive a genocide and siege carries unique challenges.

Amal's husband was in Egypt on October 7th, 2023 when the Gaza war began, helping their daughter begin her university studies there, while another son was also working abroad. Her only other immediate family in Gaza is a son who works as a doctor in another area of the Gaza Strip, from whom she has been separated for months. She fled her family home which she was staying in alone following forced evacuation orders from the Israeli army, and went to live in the office of her workplace, with only one change of clothes. The family home was destroyed. She described herself as "lucky" to be able to eat one meal a day: canned beans and a piece of bread.

The struggle faced by the 700,000 women like Amal of menstruating age to access sanitary napkins and other hygienic products and facilities became a priority for her and the Women's Center. When they still had supplies, they distributed "Dignity Kits" containing sanitary napkins, soap, combs, etc. The lack of access to clean water and private areas in light of the widespread destruction of residential and public facilities, as well as ongoing siege, has impacted the most basic human and women's rights.

== Research and publications ==
Syam has supervised multiple research projects conducted by WAC on issues including:

- Gender-based violence
- Women’s access to justice
- Violence against women with disabilities
- The effects of armed conflict on women in Gaza
- Needs and priorities of women in crisis contexts

She is also the general supervisor of Al-Ghaidaa Magazine, a periodical published by the Women's Affairs Center that focuses on women's and social issues in Palestinian society.

Syam's media appearances have included public interviews and commentary on women's roles in Conflict Zones and post-war reconstruction.

== Affiliations and representation ==
Syam is a member of several national and regional networks, including:

- The CEDAW Coalition (Palestine)
- The National Coalition for United Nations Security Council Resolution 1325
- The Palestinian Non-Governmental Organizations Network (PNGO)
- The Independent Commission for Human Rights (as a commissioner)
- The Arab Network for the Arab Feminist Community

She has represented Palestinian women and civil society organizations at international conferences addressing women's rights, development, and humanitarian issues. She has also spoken about the gendered impacts of military conflict and the role of justice mechanisms in ceasefire and post-conflict frameworks.

== Recognition ==
Syam has been acknowledged for her contributions to regional and international dialogues on gender and development. Her work has also been referenced in academic and policy literature addressing women's leadership and activism in the Middle East. A 2014 publication examining gender and development in conflict contexts discusses her role within Palestinian women's organisations and situates her work within broader grassroots advocacy efforts.

In June 2021, Syam was honored at the 9th International Human Rights Festival in Rabat, Morocco, for her leadership in defending women's rights in Palestine.
