= Hiba Abu Nada =

Palestinian poet and novelist (1991–2023)

- هبة أبو ندى
- Born: Hiba Kamal Saleh Abu Nada; 24 June 1991; Mecca, Saudi Arabia
- Died: 20 October 2023 (aged 32); Khan Yunis, Gaza Strip
- Cause of death: Israeli airstrike
- Education: Islamic University of Gaza; Al-Azhar University – Gaza
- Occupations: Poet, novelist and nutritionist

Hiba (Note: Sometimes transliterated as "Heba" in accordance with Palestinian Arabic pronunciation and regional Arabizi romanisations of Kasra see Levantine Arabic#Orthography and writing systems) Kamal Abu Nada (Arabic: هبة كمال أبو ندى,; 24 June 1991 – 20 October 2023) was a Palestinian poet, novelist, nutritionist, women's rights activist and Wikimedian. Her novel Oxygen is not for the dead won second place in the Sharjah Award for Arab Creativity in 2017. She was killed in her home in the Gaza Strip by an Israeli airstrike in the Gaza war.

== Biography ==
Abu Nada was born in Mecca, Saudi Arabia, on 24 June 1991 to a family of Palestinian refugees displaced by the depopulation of the village of Bayt Jirja by Israeli forces during the Nakba. She received a bachelor's degree of biochemistry from Islamic University, Gaza, and a master's degree in clinical nutrition from Al-Azhar University. Abu Nada was a contributor to Wikipedia. In 2021 she volunteered at Wikipedia through the distance learning program WikiWrites and she was a linguistic proofreader of articles before they were published by students.

She worked for a time at the Rusul Center for Creativity, associated with the al-Amal Institute for Orphans. According to Al-Ayyam, she was "preoccupied with justice, the uprisings of the Arab Spring, and the realities of Palestinian life under occupation."

She published a number of collections of poetry, and a novel, titled al-Uksujīn laysa lil-mawtā ("Oxygen is not for the dead", Arabic: الأكسجين ليس للموتى). The novel centers the Palestinian experience under occupation within the Arab Spring. Her work was also published in three anthologies: أبجدية القيد الأخير (Alphabets of the Last Manacle), العصف المأكول (The Eaten Straw), and شاعر غزة (The Poet of Gaza).

In 2017, she won second place in the 20th annual Sharjah Award for Arab Creativity, held by the United Arab Emirates, for her novel. The book was republished by Dar Diwan in 2021. She was posthumously awarded the Anwar Salman Award.

=== Death ===
Some of her posts in the first days of the war were shared and translated, becoming better known after her death. In her post on X written on October 7, at the start of Hamas-led attack on Israel, she wrote (in Arabic):

Someone wanted to walk in the streets of his occupied city. Why is everyone so surprised? We also "see it far away and see it soon".

In her last post on X, written next day, on October 8, she wrote:

Gaza’s night is dark apart from the glow of rockets,
quiet apart from the sound of the bombs,
terrifying apart from the comfort of prayer,
black apart from the light of the martyrs.
Good night, Gaza.

Writer Anthony Anaxagorou translated a poem that he reported was her last writing. Physician and poet Fady Joudah translated one of her posts from 18 October:

Each of us in Gaza is either witness to or martyr for liberation. Each is waiting to see which of the two they'll become up there with God. We have already started building a new city in Heaven.

Doctors without patients. No one bleeds. Teachers in uncrowded classrooms. No yelling at students. New families without pain or sorrow. Journalists writing up and taking photos of eternal love. They're all from Gaza.

In Heaven, the new Gaza is free of siege. It is taking shape now.

On 20 October 2023, she was killed by an Israeli airstrike while at her home in Khan Yunis in southern Gaza. She was 32.

== Works ==
- الأكسجين ليس للموتى [Oxygen is not for the dead: a novel] (in Arabic). دائرة الثقافة، حكومة الشارقة،, al-Shāriqah. 2017. ISBN 978-9948-23-314-5. OCLC 1032289333.
- "I Grant You Refuge". Protean Magazine. Translated by Fakhreddine, Huda. 3 November 2023.
