= 14 October 2024 Al-Aqsa Hospital attack =

October 2024 Israeli bombing of a hospital in the Gaza Strip

- Part of the Gaza war and genocide
- Location: 31°25′11.89″N 34°21′36″E; Deir el-Balah, Gaza Strip
- Date: 14 October 2024; ~1:00 (UTC+02:00)
- Target: Shuhada al-Aqsa Hospital
- Attack type: Airstrike, death by burning
- Deaths: 6+ Palestinians
- Injuries: 70+ Palestinians
- Perpetrator: Israel Defense Forces: Israeli Air Force

On 14 October 2024, the Israeli Air Force struck tents within the grounds of the Shuhada al-Aqsa Hospital in Deir el-Balah, Gaza Strip, which it said were used as a terror command center. As of 14 October 2024, at least 5 people were confirmed killed in the attack and at least 70 were injured after a major fire broke out in nearby tents. The death toll was expected to increase due to the large number of victims with severe burns. 25 people were transferred to Nasser Hospital in southern Gaza. It was the seventh attack on the hospital since March 2024. Following the spread of videos showing people burning alive in nearby tents, the White House expressed its concerns to Israel.

Around one million displaced people are estimated to be sheltering in Deir el-Balah, which is supposedly considered to be part of Israel's "humanitarian zone" in the Gaza Strip.

== Airstrike ==
At approximately 1 AM on 14 October 2024, the Israeli Air Force launched an airstrike on a tent camp housing displaced people on the grounds of the Shuhada al-Aqsa Hospital in Deir el-Balah, Gaza Strip, an area which the IDF said was used as a terror command center. The strike hit while emergency services were receiving injured people from the Israeli bombardment of the al-Mufti school in Nuseirat hours before, which killed 22 and injured 80 people. According to a Doctors Without Borders coordinator on site, the fire destroyed structures sheltering 37 families. The strike caused families' cooking gas cylinders to explode, further fueling the fire. Four munitions experts reviewing videos of the blaze added that some of the secondary explosions were probably caused by small-arms ammunition but cautioned it was difficult to determine the exact balance without access to the site. Footage showed tents on fire while people tried to extinguish the flames.

Israel claimed to have targeted a Hamas command center embedded in the car park, without providing evidence. Doctors without Borders (MSF), which has staff working in Al-Aqsa Hospital, reported that "it had no knowledge" of a Hamas command center and that "the hospital functions as a hospital".

== Victims ==
Al-Aqsa Hospital fire
- External video
- (GRAPHIC) Video of fire after Israeli attack, Sha'ban al-Dalou visible.

The head of the hospital's emergency department said many of the injured were women and children. Hospital staff said while the hospital itself was not damaged in the strike, they had to treat patients on the floor for lack of beds. Most of the injured had second and third degree burns; some also had shrapnel wounds requiring critical care. Most of the survivors would eventually die from their "massive and deep" burns, a medical worker said.

Widely shared videos of the blaze, verified by NBC, showed at least one person, who was lying on a bed and according to some reports appeared to be connected to an IV drip, burning alive, with onlookers unable to reach and save him. The victim, identified as Sha'ban al-Dalou, was a 19-year-old software engineering student at Al-Azhar University who was injured at the IDF's bombing of the Shuhada al-Aqsa mosque a week prior. According to a surviving brother, Al-Dalou's leg had become trapped in the blast, leaving him unable to escape. Al-Dalou's mother was also killed in the fire. His father suffered severe burns while pulling two of the family's children out of the flames. Sha'ban's 11-year-old brother, Abdul Rahman al-Dalou, also died from his burns on 17 October. Ahmed Al-Dalou, Sha'ban's and Abdul's father stated, "I cannot forget the smell of their burning bodies. It is stuck in my nose and mind. Every time I close my eyes, I see my wife and son burning."

== Responses ==
=== Domestic ===
- Israel
  - Israel Defense Force: Israeli military spokesperson Col. Avichay Adraee said the air force had bombed a "command and control center" in the hospital, and Lt. Col. Nadav Shoshani described it as a "precise strike on terrorists who were operating inside a command and control center in the area of a parking lot adjacent", both without providing evidence.

=== International ===
- United States:
  - A U.S. National Security Council spokesperson told The New York Times and The Times of Israel the White House had expressed its concern to Israel. "The images and video of what appear to be displaced civilians burning alive following an Israeli airstrike are deeply disturbing, and we have made our concerns clear to the Israeli government," the spokesperson said. "Israel has a responsibility to do more to avoid civilian casualties – and what happened here is horrifying, even if Hamas was operating near the hospital in an attempt to use civilians as human shields."
  - The U.S. Ambassador to the United Nations, Linda Thomas-Greenfield, said at the October 16, 2024 UN Security Council meeting: "'Colleagues, this weekend, like so many of you – like so many people around the world – I watched in horror as images from Central Gaza poured across my screen. Images of what appeared to be displaced civilians burning alive following an Israeli air strike. There are no words, simply no words, to describe what we saw. Israel has a responsibility to do everything possible to avoid civilian casualties, even if Hamas was operating near the hospital in an attempt to use civilians as human shields. We have made this clear to Israel."
  - Congresswoman Cori Bush (D-MI) and Representative Alexandria Ocasio-Cortez (D-NY) both called for an arms embargo over Twitter. Responding to the Times of Gaza's coverage on the fire, Bush tweeted, "There are no words powerful enough to capture the agony of human beings being massacred & burned alive. The U.S. is funding & arming the Israeli military’s extermination of the Palestinian people. It’s unconscionable. End this genocide. There must be an #ArmsEmbargoNow". Ocasio-Cortez tweeted, "The horrors unfolding in northern Gaza are the result of a completely unrestrained Netanyahu gov, fully armed by the Biden admin while food aid is blocked and patients are bombed in hospitals. This is a genocide of Palestinians. The US must stop enabling it. Arms embargo now."
- United Kingdom:
  - The UK Ambassador to the United Nations, Barbara Woodward, said at the October 16, 2024 UN Security Council meeting: "[T]here are no safe places in Gaza. Just this week we saw horrifying images following the Israeli strike on Al-Aqsa hospital, inside the IDF designated humanitarian zone."
- United Nations: UNICEF condemned the attack, posting: "Today, our screens were once again filled with horrifying reports of children killed, burned, and families emerging from bombed tents in Gaza. These should shock the world to its coreAttacks on shelters in Deir al-Balah and at al-Aqsa hospital, which reportedly killed 15 children, prove again that there is no safe place in Gaza. This shameful violence against children must end now."

=== Other ===
- Médecins Sans Frontières: The organization, which supports the hospital, called the attack "totally unacceptable," saying: "Repeated attacks on medical facilities in Gaza must end. Health structures and medical staff must be protected at all times, and warring parties must respect hospital grounds. People in Gaza are trapped under relentless bombings. A ceasefire is needed now to stop this bloodshed."

Following the spread on social media of a video of Sha'ban al-Dalou burning to death during the attack, several pro-Israel accounts spread the false Pallywood conspiracy theory that the video had been staged. More broadly, however, images of al-Dalou's death sparked outrage and added to growing concerns about Israel's conduct in Gaza. An independent journalist who filmed the bombing stated, "I saw people burning in front of me. By god, no one could do anything. The man, the woman and the little girl burning in front of me".

== See also ==
- Attacks on health facilities during the Gaza war
- Gaza genocide
