= Bayt Jirja =

Bayt Jirja بيت جرجه Beit Jerja
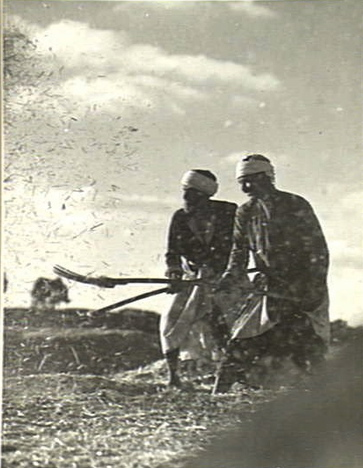
- Farmers near Bayt Jirja threshing wheat in 1940
- Etymology: The house of the highway
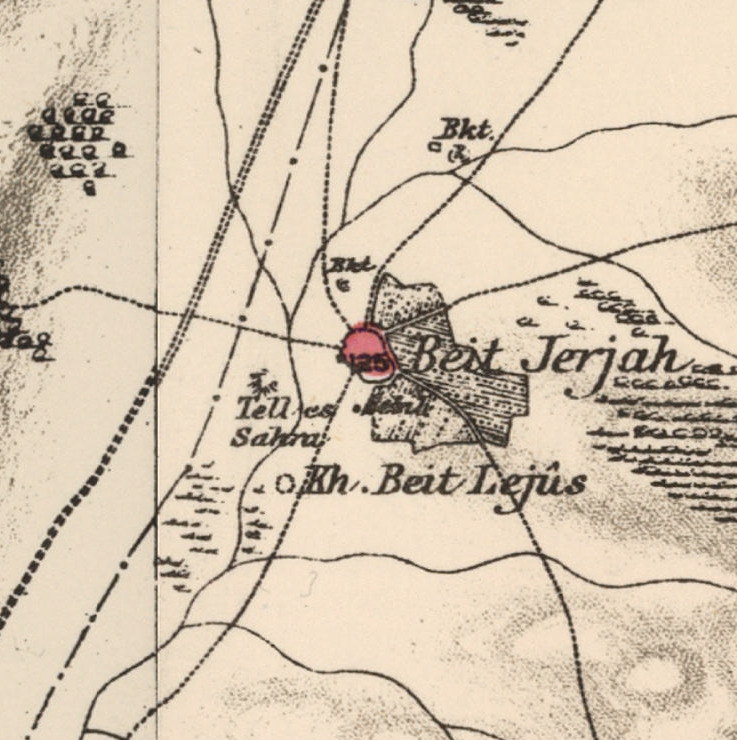
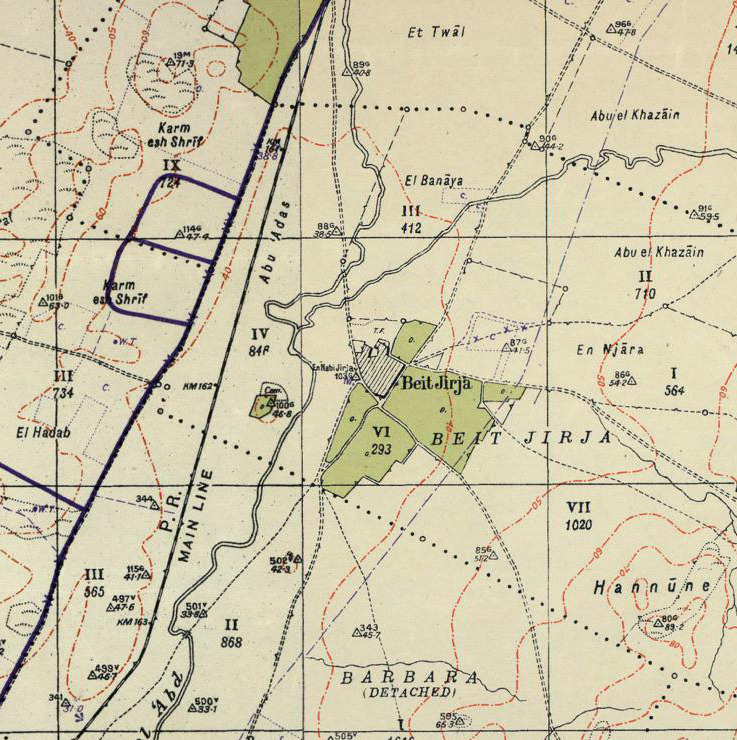
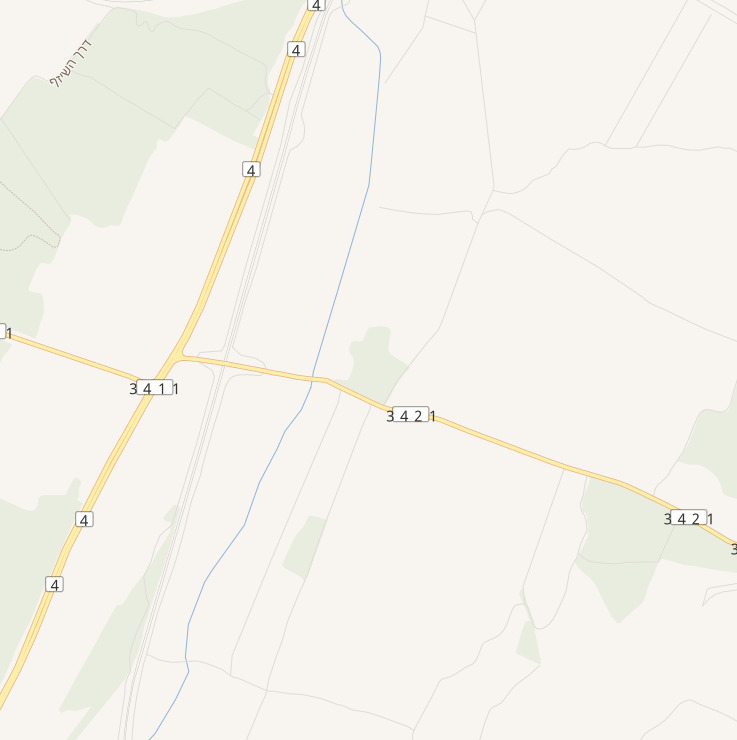
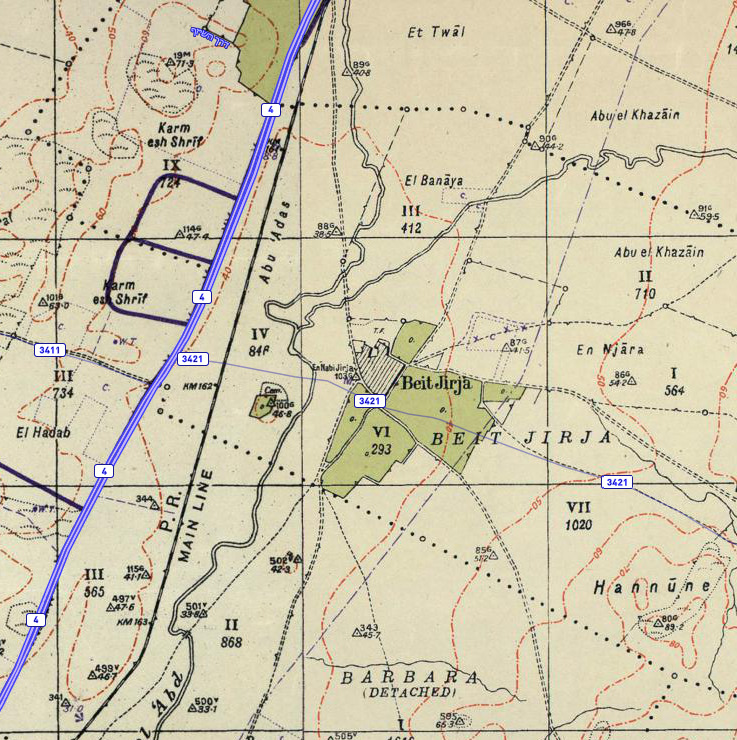
- 1870s map 1940s map modern map 1940s with modern overlay map A series of historical maps of the area around Bayt Jirja (click the buttons)

- Location within Mandatory Palestine
- Coordinates: 31°36′11″N 34°34′51″E
- Palestine grid: 110/112
- Geopolitical entity: Mandatory Palestine
- Subdistrict: Gaza
- Date of depopulation: date unknown

Area
  - Total: 8,015 dunams (8.015 km^{2}; 3.095 sq mi)

Population (1945)
  - Total: 940
- Current Localities: None

Bayt Jirja or Beit Jerja (Arabic: بيت جرجه) was a Palestinian Arab village 15.5 km Northeast of Gaza. In 1931 the village consisted of 115 houses. It was overrun by Israeli forces during operation Yo'av in the 1948 Arab-Israeli war. Bayt Jirja was found depopulated in November 1948, during "clean up sweeps" to expel any partial inhabited villages and destroy village housing to prevent any possible re-occupation in the area. The village was completely destroyed after the occupation and only one tomb remains.

== History ==
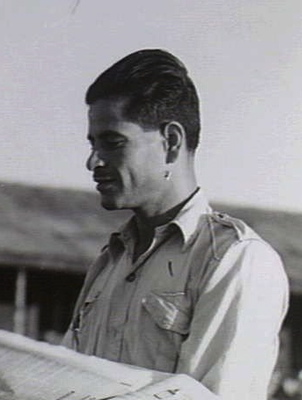
Newspaper salesman, Bayt Jirja, 1941

Bayt Jirja contained the archaeological site of Khirbat 'Amuda, excavation there in 2005 yielded coins and pottery fragments from the Byzantine and early Islamic period.

Khirbat 'Amuda was known to the Crusaders as Amouhde, and pottery fragments, cisterns, and a pool have also been found there.

The Arab geographer Yaqut, writing in the 1220s called the village for "Jirja", and said it was the birthplace of Abu al-Fadl al-Jirjawi, at one time the major authority in Palestine on hadith.

=== Ottoman era ===
In 1517, Bayt Jirja was incorporated into the Ottoman Empire with the rest of Palestine, and in 1596 the village appeared in the Ottoman tax registers (named "Bayt Harja" (Farja)) as being in the nahiya (subdistrict) of Gaza, part of the Sanjak of Gaza, with a population of 71 households and 14 bachelors, an estimated 468 persons, all Muslims. The villagers paid a fixed tax rate of 33.3% on a number of crops, including wheat, barley and fruit trees, as well as on goats and beehives; a total of 18,500 akçe. All of the revenue went to a waqf.

During the 17th and 18th centuries, the area of Bayt Jirja experienced a significant process of settlement decline due to nomadic pressures on local communities. The residents of abandoned villages moved to surviving settlements, but the land continued to be cultivated by neighboring villages. The village must have been destroyed, as a marble slab at the entrance to the yard of the village mosque proclaimed that Abdullah Pasha of Acre, via his delegate Mohammed Shahin, had rebuilt the village in 1825–26.

In 1838, Beit Jerja was noted as a Muslim village in the Gaza area.

In May 1863, Victor Guérin visited the village. He found it had 370 inhabitants, and a wali with ancient granite columns. Socin found from an official Ottoman village list from about 1870 that Bayt Jirja had a population of 106, with a total of 34 houses, though the population count included men, only. Hartmann found that Bet Dschardscha had 32 houses.

In 1883 the PEF's Survey of Western Palestine described Bayt Jirja as small, with gardens, and supplied with water from cisterns and a pond.

=== British Mandate era ===
In the 1922 census of Palestine, conducted by the British Mandate authorities, Beit Jerja had a population of 397 inhabitants, all Muslims, increasing in the 1931 census to 619, still all Muslim, in 115 houses.

The villagers kept a shrine, located on the eastern edge and overlooking Wadi al-Abd, and which they believed to be the tomb of "prophet" (nabi) Jirja. An elementary school was established in the center of village in 1932, and it had 67 students in the mid-1940s. The village center also contained some small shops. There were a number of wells, ranging in depth from 30 to 80 meters, which supplied drinking and irrigation water.

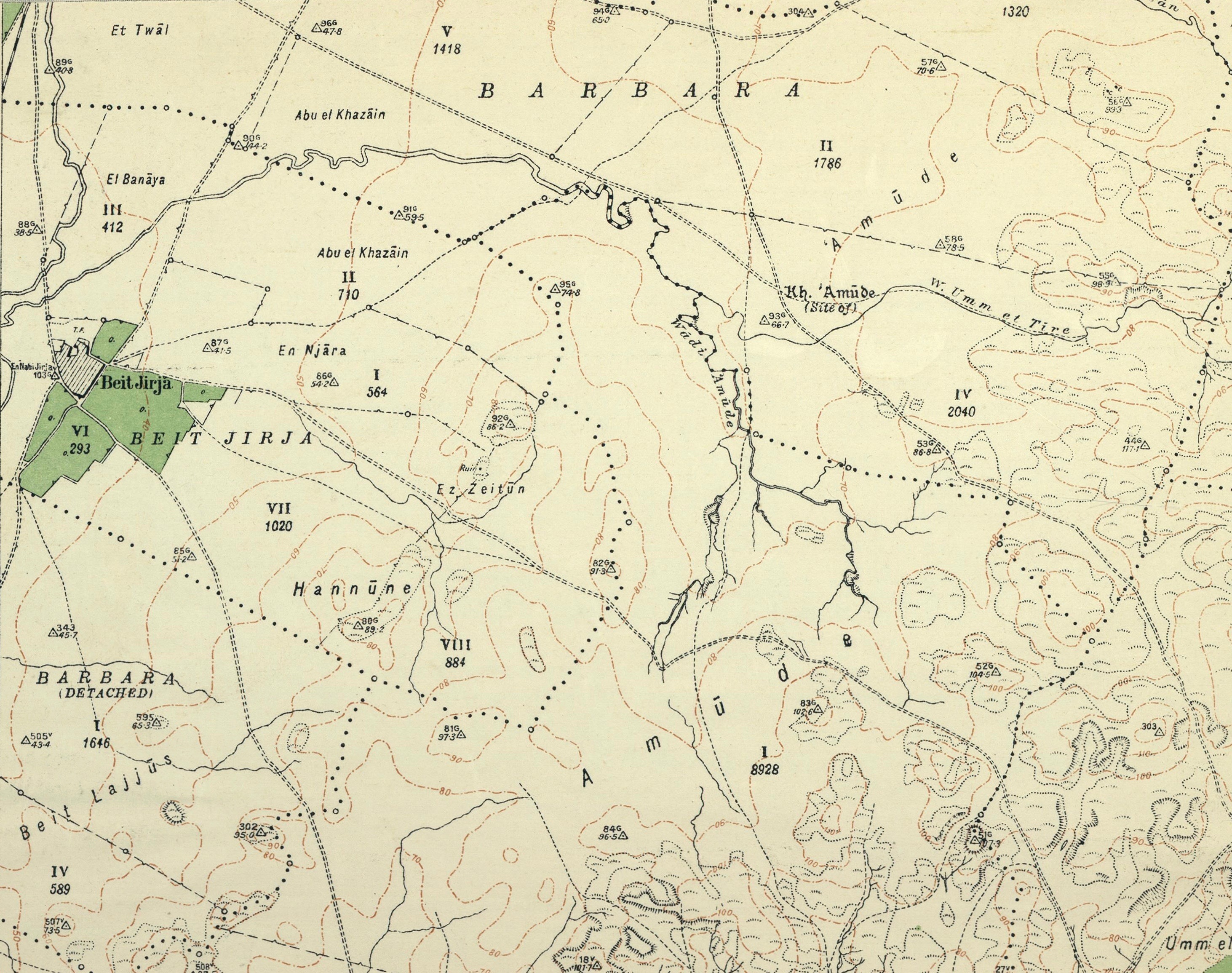
Beit Jirja 1931 1:20,000

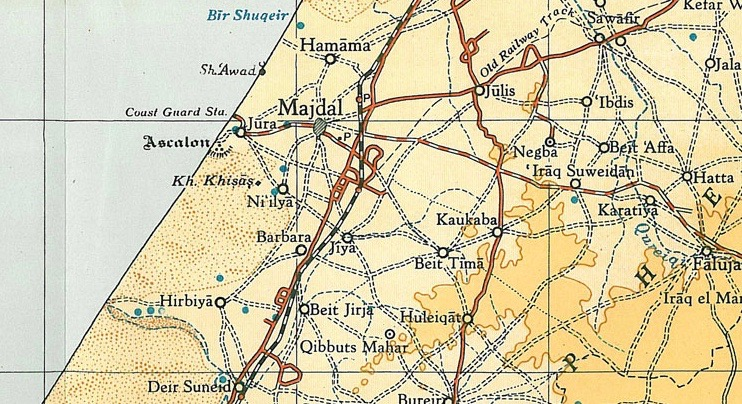
Beit Jirja 1945 1:20,000

In the 1945 statistics the population of Beit Jirja consisted of 940 Muslims with a land area of 8,015 dunams, according to an official land and population survey. Of this, 434 dunams were designated for citrus and bananas, 618 for plantations and irrigable land, 6,911 for cereals, while 25 dunams were built-up areas.

=== 1948 War ===
The village was probably captured in early November 1948, along with neighbouring al-Majdal, during the last phase of Operation Yoav. The villagers fled or were expelled and the village was destroyed.

According to the Palestinian historian Walid Khalidi, what remained of the village in 1992 was:

The site is encircled by barbed wire fencing, with only the street and scattered rubble still visible. One house on the northern edge of the village remains, along with some sycamore trees and cactuses. Some village lands are cultivated, while others are covered by woods.

== See also ==
- Hiba Abu Nada
- Depopulated Palestinian locations in Israel

== Bibliography ==
- Barron, J.B., ed. (1923). Palestine: Report and General Abstracts of the Census of 1922. Government of Palestine.
- Conder, C.R.; Kitchener, H.H. (1883). The Survey of Western Palestine: Memoirs of the Topography, Orography, Hydrography, and Archaeology. Vol. 3. London: Committee of the Palestine Exploration Fund.
- Government of Palestine, Department of Statistics (1945). Village Statistics, April, 1945.
- Guérin, V. (1869). Description Géographique Historique et Archéologique de la Palestine. Vol. 1: Judee, pt. 2. Paris, L'Imprimerie Imp.
- Hadawi, S. (1970). Village Statistics of 1945: A Classification of Land and Area ownership in Palestine. Palestine Liberation Organization Research Center.
- Hartmann, M. (1883). "Die Ortschaftenliste des Liwa Jerusalem in dem türkischen Staatskalender für Syrien auf das Jahr 1288 der Flucht (1871)". Zeitschrift des Deutschen Palästina-Vereins. 6: 102–149.
- Hütteroth, W.-D.; Abdulfattah, K. (1977). Historical Geography of Palestine, Transjordan and Southern Syria in the Late 16th Century. Erlanger Geographische Arbeiten, Sonderband 5. Erlangen, Germany: Vorstand der Fränkischen Geographischen Gesellschaft. ISBN 3-920405-41-2.
- Khalidi, W. (1992). All That Remains: The Palestinian Villages Occupied and Depopulated by Israel in 1948. Washington, D.C.: Institute for Palestine Studies. ISBN 0-88728-224-5.
- Mills, E, ed. (1932). Census of Palestine 1931. Population of Villages, Towns and Administrative Areas. Jerusalem: Government of Palestine.
- Morris, B. (2004). The Birth of the Palestinian Refugee Problem Revisited. Cambridge: Cambridge University Press. ISBN 978-0-521-00967-6.
- Nahshoni, Pirhiya (10 September 2008). "Khirbat 'Amuda" (120). Hadashot Arkheologiyot – Excavations and Surveys in Israel.
- Palmer, E.H. (1881). The Survey of Western Palestine: Arabic and English Name Lists Collected During the Survey by Lieutenants Conder and Kitchener, R. E. Transliterated and Explained by E.H. Palmer. Committee of the Palestine Exploration Fund.
- Robinson, E.; Smith, E. (1841). Biblical Researches in Palestine, Mount Sinai and Arabia Petraea: A Journal of Travels in the year 1838. Vol. 3. Boston: Crocker & Brewster.
- Sharon, M. (1999). Corpus Inscriptionum Arabicarum Palaestinae, B-C. Vol. 2. BRILL. ISBN 90-04-11083-6.
- Socin, A. (1879). "Alphabetisches Verzeichniss von Ortschaften des Paschalik Jerusalem". Zeitschrift des Deutschen Palästina-Vereins. 2: 135–163.
