= Postwar reconstruction =

Postwar reconstruction may refer to:

- Marshall Plan (World War II), the Allied plan for postwar reconstruction in Western and Central Europe.
- Molotov Plan (World War II), the Soviet Union aid to rebuild the countries in Eastern Europe.
- Reconstruction era (U.S. Civil War), the postwar reconstruction of the Deep South.
