= Shuhada al-Aqsa Hospital =

Hospital in Gaza

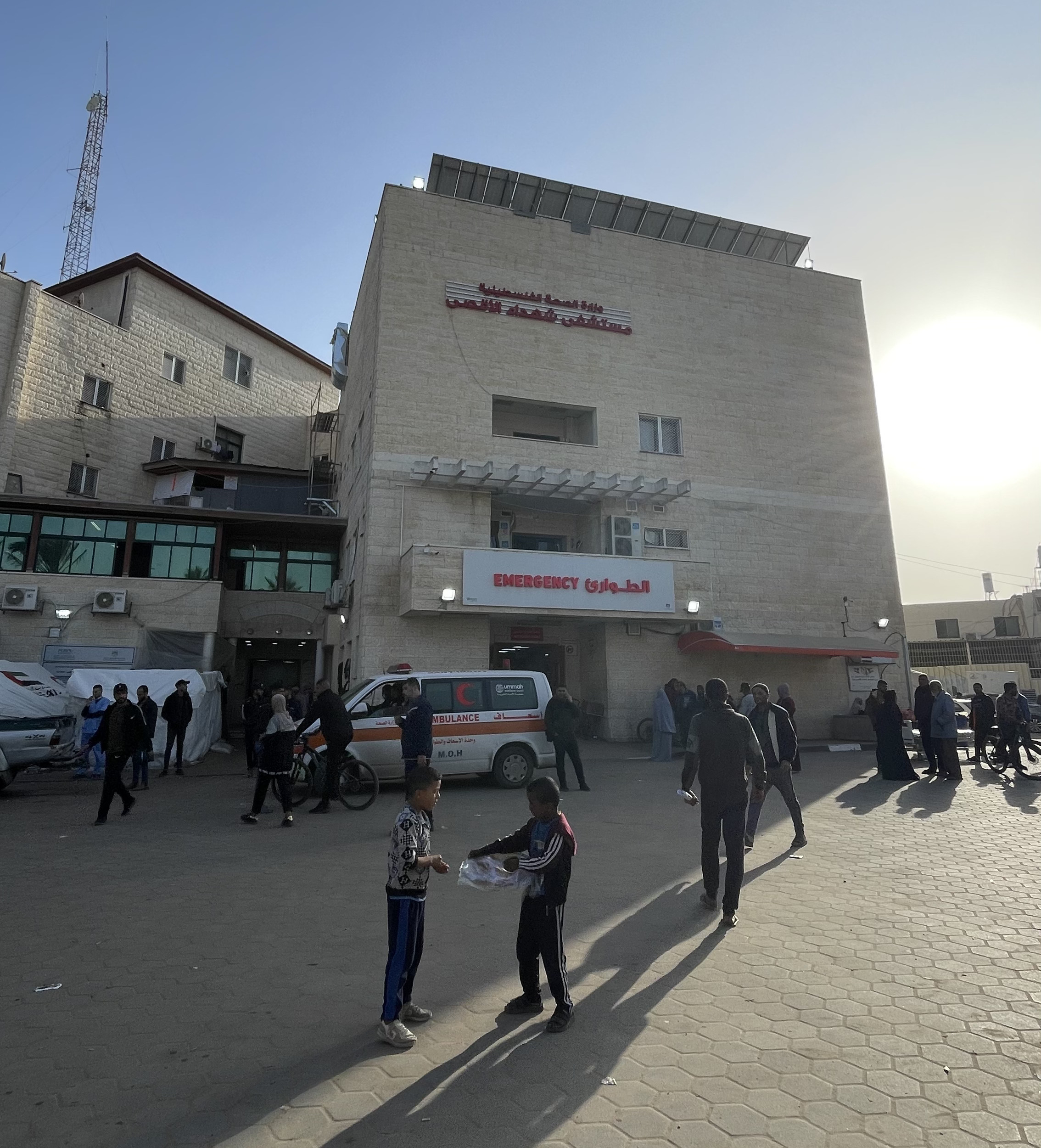
- The hospital in January 2024

Geography
- Location: Deir al-Balah, Deir al-Balah Governorate, Gaza Strip, Palestine
- Coordinates: 31°25′11.89″N 34°21′36″E

Organisation
- Type: Treatment

History
- Founded: 2001

Shuhada al-Aqsa Hospital (Arabic: مستشفى شهداء الأقصى الحكومي, romanized: Mustashfaa shuhada' al'aqsaa alhukumii, lit. 'al-Aqsa Martyrs Governmental Hospital') is a hospital in Deir al-Balah, Gaza Strip, Palestine.

Shuhada was founded in 2001. As of 2018, it was one of fifteen public hospitals in the Gaza Strip.

It is managed by UNRWA, The Ministry of Health and various NGOs. The hospital served an estimated 18,000 patients each month until recently. According to The Ministry of Health, the hospital's emergency department had over 11,000 visits. In 2018, the hospital had 166 beds.

== History ==
Caught in the ongoing Israeli–Palestinian conflict, the hospital has both been targeted and faced repercussions of nearby targeting from the IDF. In 2014, several shells hit the hospital's intensive care unit in an IDF bombing campaign that was targeting anti-tank missiles in the area. Four Palestinians were killed, and an estimated forty others were injured. During the Gaza war, the hospital faced immense overcrowding. IDF airstrikes in Deir al-Balah and around the hospital resulted in hundreds of deaths and injuries.

=== Gaza war ===
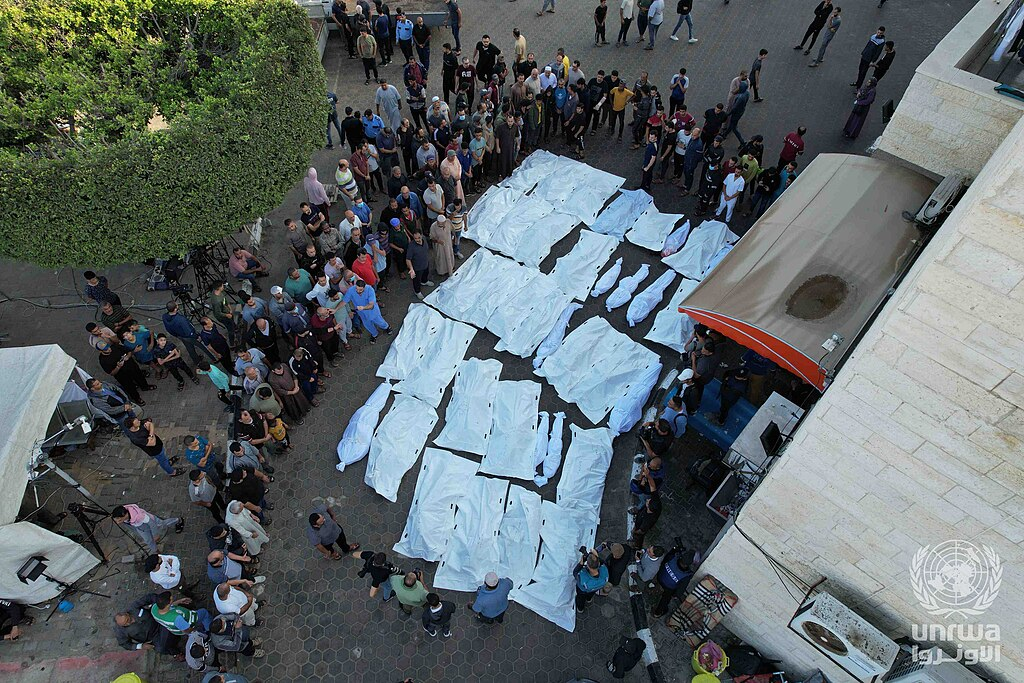
Relatives of Palestinians who died in Israeli airstrikes gathering around the bodies taken from the morgue of Al-Aqsa hospital in Deir el-Balah

Beginning on 6 January, doctors at Shuhada al-Aqsa Hospital reported that Israeli fire was nearing the hospital. Tens of thousands of people were reported to be sheltering at the hospital. British doctor Nick Maynard stated his medical team was forced to evacuate the hospital as Israeli troops attacked the hospital. Medical Aid for Palestinians and the International Rescue Committee both also evacuated their medical teams when the IDF dropped leaflets telling nearby residents they were in a "dangerous combat zone." Following a visit to the hospital, the World Health Organization found 70% of staff and many patients had fled. Doctors reported many patients who were physically unable to move, and that conditions were rapidly deteriorating, with one doctor stating, "A child came in alive, literally burnt to the bone, their hands were contracting. Their face was just charcoal, and they were alive and talking. And we had no morphine."

In an interview with NPR on 10 January, one American doctor described the situation at Al-Aqsa as the "stuff of nightmares". Tedros Adhanom Ghebreyesus, the World Health Organization chief, stated, "Three months into this conflict, it is inconceivable that this most essential need — the protection of health care — is not assured." Health professionals and doctors warned of the danger of Al-Aqsa's closure since it was the last remaining hospital in the entirety of central Gaza. On 13 January, the hospital ran out of fuel to power its generators, leading to a blackout that threatened patients. The hospital again ran out of fuel in late-May 2024.

On 1 August 2026, the Israeli military destroyed two warehouses of medical supplies next to the Shuhada al-Aqsa Hospital. Hospital spokesperson Khalil al-Daqran stated that the bombing destroyed many supplies used by the dialysis department and intensive care.

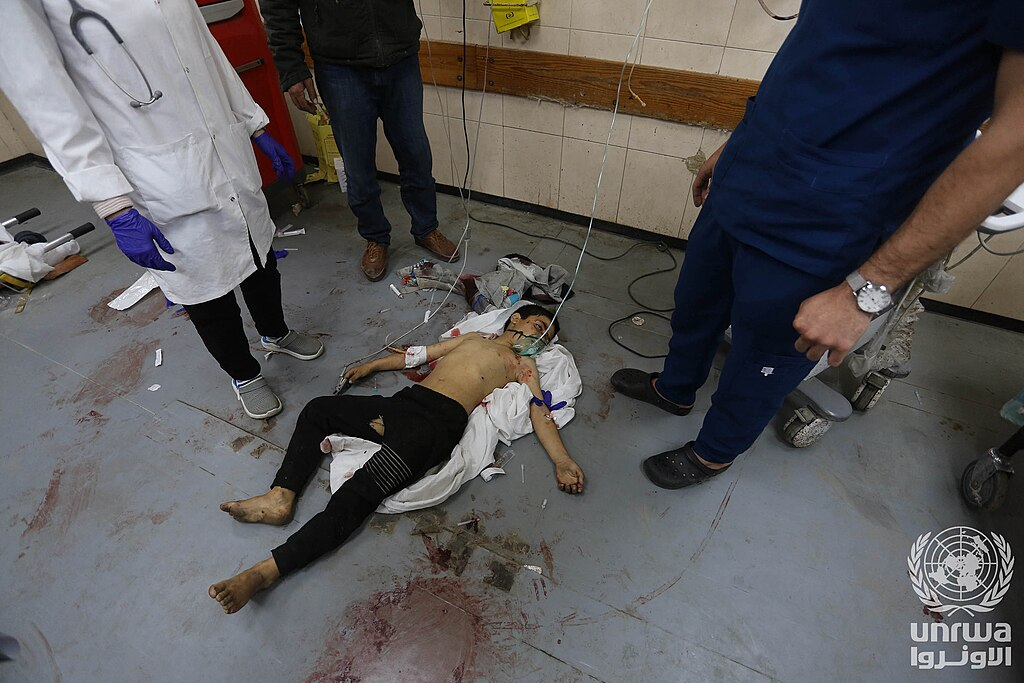
Injured Palestinians receive medical treatment at Al-Aqsa Martyrs hospital after an Israeli airstrike in Deir el-Balah, Gaza on 7 January 2024.

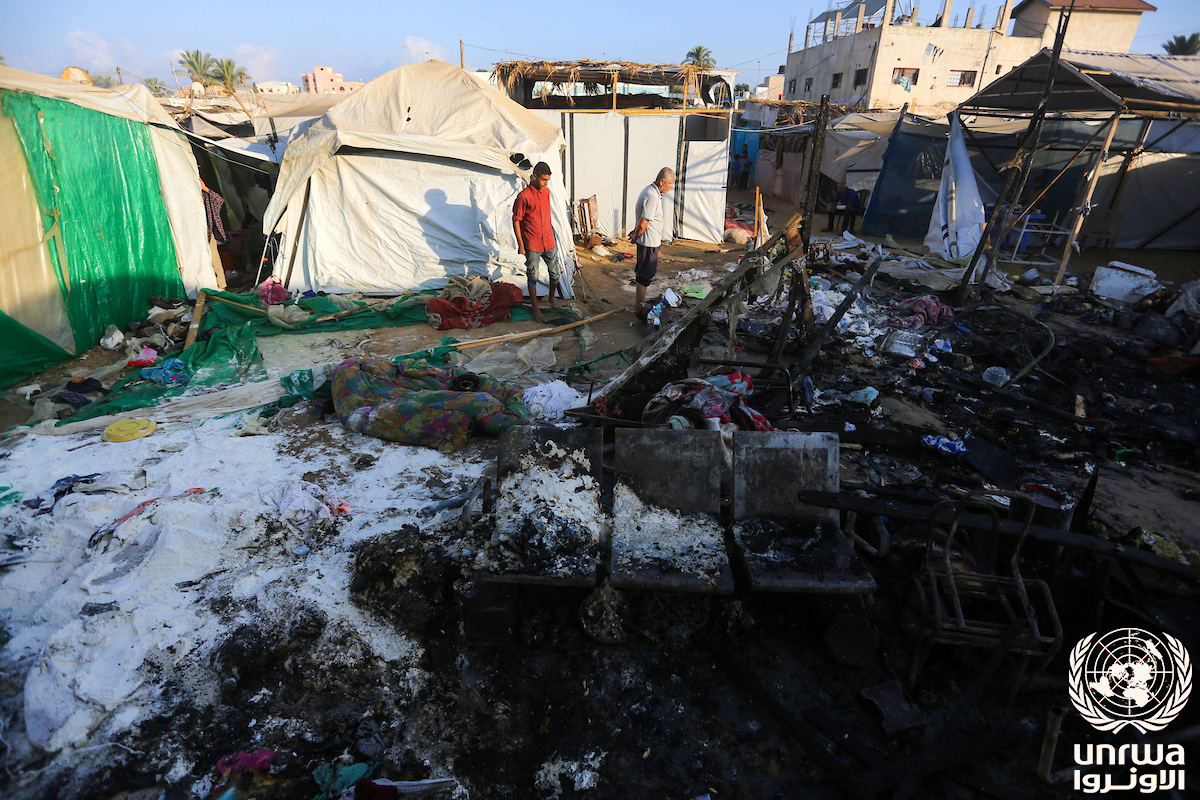
The remains of bombed tents in the hospital courtyard in August 2024

In June 2024, the situation at the hospital was said to be "something above emergency", as the hospital ran out of fuel. In July 2024, an Israeli airstrike destroyed a media tent outside the hospital. In August 2024, at least four Palestinians including a woman were killed and 18 were injured in an Israeli bombing of tents used by displaced people in the courtyard of the hospital. These displaced people had moved into the courtyard following the bombing of a nearby evacuation shelter in late-July 2024. At this point, the Al Aqsa Hospital was one of the last remaining hospitals operating in Gaza. In late-August, patients fled the hospital following an evacuation order from the Israeli military. In September 2024, the hospital warned that supply shortages were putting it at risk of shutting down.

==== October 2024 ====
On the night of 13 October 2024, Israeli warplanes targeted Shuhada al-Aqsa Hospital in the heart of Gaza, igniting a massive fire. Many Palestinians were asleep at the time. According to reports, the charred remains of victims are unidentifiable. Medical teams managed to rescue some women and children, but they sustained severe burns. The White House stated that the images and videos depicting Palestinian refugees burning alive as a result of this Israeli attack are profoundly disturbing and horrifying. According to Israeli intelligence officials, the bombing targeted Hamas terrorists who have used the hospital (as other hospitals) for military purposes.

Shaban al-Dalou (Note: first name also spelled Sha'ban) was a 19-year-old software engineering student and Palestinian refugee living in the heart of Gaza. He shared images depicting the plight of Palestinian refugees and released videos showcasing the wounded at Shuhada al-Aqsa Hospital, highlighting their urgent need for blood donations. Shaban and his mother were burned alive in a fire caused by Israeli bombing on October 13.

On 29 August 2026, an Israeli drone strike struck a medical supply warehouse on the hospital grounds, injuring three.

== See also ==
- List of hospitals in the State of Palestine
- Deir al-Balah
