= Medo Halimy =

Palestinian social media personality and blogger (2005–2024)

Mohammad Halimy
- ميدو حليمي
- Born: March 12, 2005; Gaza City, Palestine
- Died: August 26, 2024 (aged 19); Khan Younis, Palestine
- Cause of death: Struck by shrapnel from Israeli airstrike
- Occupations: Influencer, citizen journalist
- Known for: Documenting the Israeli invasion of the Gaza Strip and Gaza war on social media

Mohammad "Medo" Halimy (Arabic: ميدو حليمي; March 12, 2005 – August 26, 2024) was a Palestinian social media personality and blogger based in the Gaza Strip. He was known for his "tent life" videos documenting his experiences living in a camp for displaced Palestinians during the Israeli invasion of the Gaza Strip. He was killed on August 26, 2024, after he was hit by a shrapnel during an Israeli airstrike on Gaza's southern city of Khan Younis.

== Early life and education ==
Halimy was born and raised in Gaza City, Palestine. He was the son of Adi Al-Halimy. He had four brothers and a sister. Halimy was an alumnus United States Department of State's Kennedy-Lugar Youth Exchange and Study (YES) program which allows students from predominantly Muslim countries to live and study in the United States for an academic year. He was a student at Harker Heights High School in Harker Heights, Texas from 2021 to 2022. In the summer of 2023, Halimy worked in the Gaza-Based Spark charity. Prior to October 7, 2023, Halimy was a student at Gaza's Al-Azhar University, studying political science and economics. On October 7, 2023, Halimy's family was displaced from their home in Gaza City at beginning of the Gaza war. Throughout the Israeli invasion of the Gaza Strip, his family was displaced multiple times, moving between Khan Younis and Rafah. In late April 2024, they were sent back to Khan Younis following the invasion of Rafah. During this time, his grandmother has died due to medicine shortages from the ongoing blockade of the Gaza Strip.

== Online presence ==
Halimy launched his TikTok account after fleeing with his family to Muwasi, the southern coastal area of Gaza that Israel had designated a humanitarian safe zone. He gained a substantial following on Instagram and TikTok in the summer of 2024 through his vlogs that documented his daily life in Gaza in a camp for internally-displaced Palestinians. He showcased his "tent life" which included sharing moments of joy during deadly conditions and limited internet access, as well as, how he did chores, secured food and managed boredom. Halimy stated these vlogs were to show the resilience, strength, and survival of the Palestinian people. In addition to these daily vlogs, he also had a gardening series where he would plant seeds outside his tent to represent life. Along with his collaborator Talal Murad, they created a joint Instagram page called Gazan Experience where they would answer user questions about how Gazans were living under the current conditions. Halimy was widely praised by viewers for finding small moments of joy amid the destruction around him.

== Death ==
On August 26, 2024, Halimy was hit by a shrapnel during an Israeli airstrike on Gaza's southern city of Khan Younis. The fatal strike happened in a nearby street to Halimy and his collaborator Murad who were both hit by the deadly debris of the strike. Murad describes a flaming car in front of them and seeing Halimy bleeding from his head. It took 10 minutes for a car to arrive. He was filmed by an NBC News crew as he was rushed to the intensive care unit of Khan Younis' Nasser Hospital however, hours later, he succumbed to his injuries and died.

His death catalyzed an outpouring of grief on social media, where followers expressed shock and sadness at his death due to the close personal connections they had formed with him due to his videos.
