= Al-Azhar University – Gaza =

Public university in Gaza, Palestine

Coordinates: 31°30′54″N 34°26′12″E

Al Azhar University – Gaza
- Type: Public
- Established: 1991
- Affiliations: UNIMED
- President: Omar K. A. Melad
- Academic staff: 290
- Undergraduates: about 16,000
- Postgraduates: about 700
- Location: Gaza, Palestine
- Website: www.alazhar.edu.ps/eng/index.asp

Al-Azhar University – Gaza (AUG; Arabic: جامعة الأزهر بغزة) is a Palestinian public, non-profit, and independent higher education institution. During the first intifada, Palestinian Leader Yasser Arafat issued a decree in September 1991 to establish a Palestinian national university. AUG opened on 18 October 1991 in a two-story building with 725 students enrolled in two faculties; the Faculty of Education and the Faculty of Sharia and Law (now the Faculty of Law).

Prior to being demolished by Israeli forces during the Gaza war, the school had more than 14,000 enrolled students across 12 colleges and 80 disciplines; the school also offered 36 master's degree programs and five doctoral programs.

== History ==
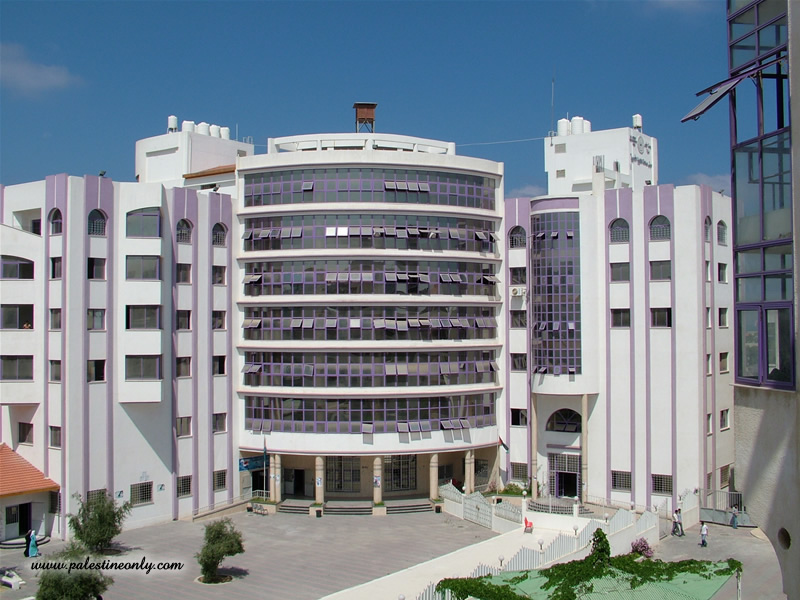
Faculty of Arts – Al Azhar university

AUG opened its doors in 1991 with the help of UNESCO and the Jordanian Ministry of Foreign Affairs with only two faculties: the Faculty of Education and the Faculty of Sharia and Law (now the Faculty of Law). In 1992, four faculties: the Faculty of Pharmacy, the Faculty of Agriculture and Environment, the Faculty of Science, and the Faculty of Arts & Human Sciences were established, followed by the Faculty of Economics and Administrative Sciences.

The Faculty of Applied Medical Sciences was established at another stage of AUG development in 1997 to fulfill the medical needs of the Palestinian community. In 1999, the Faculty of Medicine, a branch of the Palestinian Faculty of Medicine in Al-Quds University-Abu Dis, was opened as the first medical faculty in the Gaza Strip.

The Faculty of Engineering and Information Technology was launched in 2001 to keep abreast of new knowledge and technology. In 2007, the Faculty of Dentistry was opened to improve the oral health care of the Palestinian community. The Faculty of Sharia was reopened as a distinct faculty in 2009.

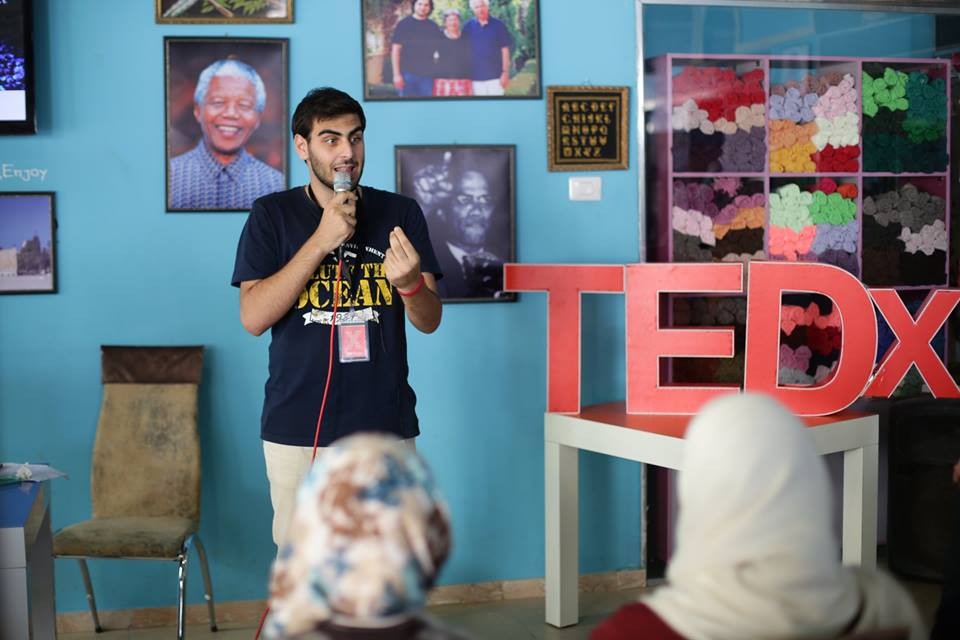
A student gives a TEDx talk at the university prior to its destruction by the Israeli military

In 2015, King Hassan II for Environmental Sciences and Agriculture Building was inaugurated on the new campus in the Al-Mughraqa area. The construction of this building was funded by King Mohammed VI of Morocco. Two buildings, the auditorium and the Faculty of Arts and Human Sciences were funded by the Saudi Fund for Development and will be annexed to the new campus in Al-Mughraqa.

=== Destruction during Gaza war ===
In November 2023, the university's facilities were destroyed by Israeli airstrikes during Israel's bombing of the Gaza Strip. The IDF performed additional demolition in December, after alleging it discovered tunnels under the university and weapons stored at the university.

The university suffered more than $200 million in losses during the Gaza war. Due to the severity of the attacks on the facility by the Israeli military, South Africa used the university's destruction as evidence in South Africa's genocide case against Israel.

== Faculties ==
- Faculty of Agriculture and Environment
- Faculty of Applied Medical Sciences
- Faculty of Arts and Human Sciences
- Faculty of Dentistry
- Faculty of Economics and Administrative Sciences
- Faculty of Engineering and Information Technology
- Faculty of Education
- Faculty of Law
- Faculty of Medicine
- Faculty of Pharmacy
- Faculty of Science
- Faculty of Sharia

== Notable alumni ==
- Hiba Abu Nada (1991–2023), Palestinian poet, novelist, and nutritionist, killed by IDF airstrike.
- Sha'ban al-Dalou (2004/2005–2024), Palestinian software engineer student, killed by IDF airstrike in the Al-Aqsa Hospital massacre.
- Motaz Azaiza (b. 1999), Palestinian photojournalist.
- Medo Halimy (2004/2005–2024), Palestinian social media personality and vlogger, political science and economics student, killed by IDF airstrike on Khan Yunis refugee camp.
- Amal Syam (born 1969), Palestinian women’s rights advocate

== See also ==
- List of Islamic educational institutions
- Education in Palestine
- Palestinian Ministry of Education and Higher Education
- List of universities and colleges in Palestine
- Attacks on schools during the Israeli invasion of Gaza
