= 2024 Deir al-Balah mosque bombing =

Bombing of a Gaza mosque and school

- Part of the Gaza war and genocide
- Location: Deir al-Balah, Gaza Strip
- Date: 6 October 2024
- Target: Shuhada al-Aqsa mosque
- Attack type: Airstrike
- Deaths: 26+ Palestinians
- Injuries: 93+ Palestinians
- Perpetrator: Israel Defense Forces

On 6 October 2024, the Israel Defense Forces bombed the Shuhada al-Aqsa mosque and the nearby Ibn Rushd school in Deir al-Balah in the central Gaza Strip. The airstrike killed at least 26 Palestinians and wounded more than 93 others. The mosque and school had been sheltering people displaced by the Israeli invasion of the Gaza Strip, including women and children.

== Background ==
The airstrike took place a day after the Israeli army issued new evacuation orders affecting parts of Nuseirat refugee camp in the central Gaza Strip, displacing hundreds of families. The IDF then announced a new air and ground offensive in Beit Lahia and Jabalia in northern Gaza.

== Airstrike ==
The IDF airstrike hit the Shuhada al-Aqsa mosque and the Ibn Rushd school early in the morning on 6 October 2024, killing more than 26 Palestinians and wounding at least 93. Israel claimed that it had conducted "precise strikes on Hamas terrorists" who were operating within "command and control centers" embedded in the mosque and the school, without providing any evidence to back its claim. A local reported that "the mosque has been here for 20 years, and the neighbourhood has displaced people". According to the United Nations, the strike brought the number of Palestinians killed in Gaza from 30 September to 4 October alone to 187.
