= Timeline of the Gaza War (2008–2009) =

Timeline of the Gaza War. For events pertaining to the conflict which occurred before 27 December 2008, see Gaza War (2008–2009)#Background and 2007–2008 Israel–Gaza conflict.

== Timeline ==
=== December ===
==== 27 December 2008 ====
Israeli armed forces began operations against Hamas and the rocket launchers at 11:30 a.m., 27 December. More than 50 fighter jets and attack helicopters entered Gazan airspace. Palestinian sources said that Israeli forces were responsible for killing 225-292 Palestinians and wounding more than 1,000. It was the most extensive attack on Gaza since 1967. The IAF, which said that it was responding to Hamas rocket attacks on southern Israel, dropped more than 100 bombs on 50 targets, which reportedly included Hamas paramilitary bases, training camps, and underground Qassam rocket launchers. Bombs were dropped on government offices, police stations, and the Hamas headquarters.

The aircraft used were F-16 fighter jets and AH-64 Apache helicopters. About 140 members of Hamas security forces were killed, including police chief Tawfiq Jabber, the head of Hamas’ security and protection unit and the police commander for central Gaza, along with at least 15 civilians. Children were among the casualties. The bombed areas included a ceremony for new police officers. About 40 graduates were killed. A mosque in Gaza City was also targeted in the airstrikes and two Palestinians were killed. Israeli military spokesmen said that the mosque was being used for "terrorist activities".

Sixty Israeli planes also targeted Hamas security and military training compounds, as well as weapon storage buildings, and dropped more than 100 tons of bombs. Some of the bombs used on 27 and 28 December were the U.S. built GBU-39 Small Diameter Bomb, the first shipment of which arrived in Israel at the beginning of the month.

Hamas later fired 700 rockets and mortars at Israel. One of the rockets hit the town of Netivot, killing an Israeli man, destroying a house and wounding six other people. Another rocket hit a synagogue in the Eshkol Regional Council, injuring two men, one seriously. In the evening two men in the Israeli community of Mivtahim were injured, one seriously, by a direct hit by a Hamas rocket.

According to United Nations officials, fuel deliveries to the Gaza Strip through the Nahal Oz crossing were suspended, with the last delivery taking place a day previous on 26 December.

Many Palestinians refer to 27 December as the Massacre of the Black Saturday as it produced the highest one-day death toll in 60 years of conflict.

==== 28 December 2008 ====
Twenty-five airstrikes were carried out on Sunday by Israel, raising the number of casualties to 287 dead and 900 wounded. According to Egyptian Foreign Minister Ahmed Aboul Gheit, Hamas refused to allow casualties to leave Gaza for medical treatment. One rocket shot by an F-16 fighter jet on a mosque near Shifa Hospital in Gaza City, from which rockets were reported by Israeli media to be launched, killed four members of Hamas. In Gaza City, five children from the same family were killed in an Israeli airstrike. Israeli jets bombed tunnels in the Rafah area. These tunnels were reportedly used to smuggle civilian goods and weapons after Israel and Egypt imposed the blockade of Gaza in June 2007. The main road of Sallah el-Dein in northern Gaza Strip was bombed. The road leads to the towns of Beit Hanoun, Beit Lahia and Jabalia. No injuries were reported in the bombing.

An Israeli air-to-ground rocket destroyed a metal workshop in northern Gaza City which, according to Israel, was used in manufacturing Qassam rockets fired at Israel. The Al-Noor organisation in Gaza City, belonging to the Hamas organization, was bombed, causing severe damage to the building. The main building of the Hamas-owned Al-Aqsa TV station was struck. The station continued broadcasting via a "mobile unit". Aidan White, Secretary-General of the International Federation of Journalists condemned the destruction of the television station, stating that international law "forbids attacks on media installations, even when they are instruments of propaganda". The IAF attacked Jabalia and northern Gaza killing two more people and wounding others.

Al Saraya, a building in Gaza City which contained government offices, security offices and a prison, was attacked. Four people died. A fuel lorry traveling in Rafah near the Egyptian border was destroyed, killing six people. The IDF also confirmed an attack on tunnels in Philadelphi Route and claimed successful destruction of 40 of them. Missiles also hit near the Beit Hanoun City Hall.

Rockets were fired from the Gaza Strip, the range of which were extended. Three rockets landed near the city of Ashdod – the fifth largest Israeli city and a main sea port. The border with Egypt was breached and inhabitants from Gaza moved into Egypt. One Egyptian border policeman was killed by Palestinian gunmen, and several Palestinians were wounded by Egyptian gunfire and taken to hospital in Egypt.

The United Nations Security Council held a closed door meeting convened at the request of Libya. The meeting lasted four hours, and resulted in a press statement calling "on the parties to stop immediately all military activities ... [and] to address the serious humanitarian and economic needs in Gaza and to take necessary measures, including opening of border crossings."

On the eve of the ground incursion by Israeli forces, Khaled Mashal assured that should IDF launch ground offensive, black destiny and abduction awaits Israeli soldiers.

==== 29 December 2008 ====
Air strikes on the Strip continued. Just after midnight on 29 December, Israeli forces made six separate airstrikes against the Islamic University of Gaza, a "cultural symbol" of Hamas, though the university had evacuated days in advance. According to The Jerusalem Post, the university hosts Hamas military laboratories under the auspices of professors and its buildings were used for storing rockets and explosives. According to the IDF and the Shin Bet, one compound near the Islamic college, which was bombed twice, was being used as a chemical lab and as a Hamas explosives lab; Israel said that Hamas had been working to improve rockets and manufacture mortar shells. Israel asserted that the university chemistry laboratory was a "fair target", even if it could not show conclusively that those inside the laboratory at the time of the attack where engaged in making weapons.

The death toll rose to 415 that morning, as reported by the Associated Press. The Palestinian interior ministry in Gaza building was hit by Israeli missiles at dawn. The university and the ministry are both located in the Tel al-Hawa neighborhood.

A mosque in the Jabaliya refugee camp was also bombed by the IAF. The building was destroyed and five young girls whose house neighboured the mosque were killed. Ziad Abu-Tir, a senior member of the Islamic Jihad's military wing was killed in a strike in the Khan Younis area.

The International Red Cross reported that hospitals in the Gaza Strip were overwhelmed and unable to cope with the casualties. Red Cross spokesman in Gaza Iyad Nasr said Gaza needed more supplies to be brought in urgently, "in particular the hospitals have been depleted and stretched to the maximum because of the closure imposed". According to the IDF, Israel permitted a number of Turkish-donated ambulances from the West Bank to be transported to the Gaza Strip, as well as Red Cross, UNRWA, World Food Programme and Doctors Without Borders medical supplies.

The Israeli city of Ashkelon was hit by a Grad rocket, killing an Israeli-Arab construction worker and seriously wounding three other people. Nahal Oz army base in Southern Israel was hit by mortar fire, killing one soldier, who was later identified as Lutfi Nasraldin. The attacks increased pressure on the government as the army amassed infantry and armored forces along the border.

Israel's military intelligence chief said that Hamas' ability to fire rockets had been reduced by 50 percent, but that Hamas continued to command "some 20,000 fighters".

The foreign ministry of Senegal reported that exiled Hamas leader Khaled Meshaal was ready to sign an immediate ceasefire with Israel, provided Israel lifted its blockade on the Gaza Strip.

On 29 December an IDF spokesperson confirmed for the first time that, apart from maintaining the naval blockade on Gaza, the Israeli Navy was taking an active part in the operation. A video taken by the Israeli Navy and published on several news sites showed the Israeli Navy attacking the Gaza coast line, using both Typhoon Weapon System and surface-to-surface missiles.

According to Haaretz, among the targets hit by the Israeli Navy were Ismayil Haniah's offices, several command and control centers used by Hamas, and a Hamas patrol boat. On 31 December, the Israeli Navy "targeted a number of Hamas outposts and rocket launching sites", according to the IDF spokesperson. On 4 January, Israel extended the naval blockade from 6 to 20 nautical miles (11–37 km; 6.9–23.0 mi) to prevent all vessels from entering the Strip.

===== Dignity incident =====
On 29 December 2008, the Free Gaza Movement motor yacht Dignity set course from Cyprus, carrying aid to Gaza. The boat, which carried Irish human rights activist Caoimhe Butterly, former United States Representative and 2008 Green Party nominee for U.S. President Cynthia McKinney, journalists from Al Jazeera and CNN such as Karl Penhaul, and three surgeons including Dr. Elena Theoharous, a member of the Cyprus Parliament, attempted to enter the Gaza Strip, carrying 3.5 tonnes (3.9 short tons) of medical supplies. Its passengers stated that several Israeli naval vessels approached their boat. Free Gaza member David Halpin said that Israeli officers on board asked the captain to halt the Dignity's course to Gaza, but he refused. According to CNN reporter Penhaul an Israeli vessel rammed the motor yacht, causing heavy damage. Penhaul has admittedly stated he did not have a view of the Israeli vessel at the time. Other passengers said that several Israeli vessels fired machine guns into the water. The activists stated that their boat was clearly in international waters, about "70-80 miles" or "90 miles" from the Gaza Strip coast. McKinney said that the Israeli vessel had rammed the boat "approximately three times, twice in the front and once in the side".

Israeli foreign ministry spokesman Yigal Palmor said that no shooting had occurred, and that the motor yacht was inside Israeli territorial waters, and that the boat had failed to respond to Israeli naval radio contact. Palmor said that the Dignity had crashed into an Israel vessel while attempting to outmanoeuvre it. Palmor also said that the fact that the ship was carrying journalists, including a CNN crew that had already broadcast live three times, proved that the incident was a provocation on the part of the media. Immediately after the incident, the boat turned back. Palmor stated that the naval ship offered to assist the passengers but that they had declined the offer. Palmor also stated that Israeli ships escorted the damaged boat to Cypriot territorial waters. It did not have enough fuel to return to Cyprus and ended up docking in Lebanon, where it was greeted with cheering crowds.

Cypriot Foreign Minister Markos Kyprianou stated that Cyprus would lodge a formal complaint regarding the incident. In a written statement, the Consulate General of Israel to the Southeast USA, based in Atlanta, Georgia, said that McKinney "has taken it upon herself to commit an act of provocation", endangering herself and the crew, and called her behavior "irresponsible".

==== 30 December 2008 ====
Israeli air-strikes struck five ministerial buildings, another structure owned by Islamic University, a sports center, two Hamas training camps, the home of a senior Hamas commander (who was not present), and offices of the Popular Resistance Committees. 10 fatalities were reported. The "whole compound" of ministerial buildings in Gaza City, including the Ministries of Finance, Interior and Education, were "completely destroyed" by 30 December. The International Middle East Media Center stated that the ministries were "not 'terrorist' or military sites" and that the buildings were "civilian buildings that served the population in civil matters". The premises of the Gaza Community Mental Health Programme (GCMHP) were destroyed.

Gazans said that most Israeli strikes came without warning, but Israeli forces said in reply that they offered general warnings by dropping leaflets and by interrupting radio broadcasts telling Gaza residents to flee their homes if they were hiding weapons or terrorists. Amnesty International argued that "there are no 'safe' places in Gaza for civilians to seek shelter".

Israel kept schools closed within a radius of about 50 km (31 mi) from the Gaza border, citing concerns about further rocket fire. Residents were told to remain indoors and on the alert for alarms heralding incoming rockets. Hamas launched Chinese-made rockets at Beersheba, a city in southern Israel. A Grad missile landed in an empty kindergarten, causing damage. 24 Qassam rockets and 11 mortars were fired into Israel, causing some damage but no injuries.

Egypt said it would only fully open its border with the Gaza Strip if the crossing post were to come under the control of Mahmoud Abbas's Palestinian Authority.

Israel had banned reporters from entering the Gaza strip since November 2008, citing security reasons. A petition made by 400 foreign journalists to enter the Gaza Strip was filed with Israel's supreme court.

Israel permitted 100 trucks carrying humanitarian supplies to enter the Gaza Strip via the Kerem Shalom border crossing. Five ambulances donated by Turkey were also allowed entry.

==== 31 December 2008 ====
About 35 Hamas fighters and five Palestinians civilians were killed during continued air strikes, as UNRWA reported that at least 25 percent of the dead thus far in the conflict had been civilians. Israel continued bombing, striking "dozens of targets" including smuggling tunnels along the Egypt–Gaza border.

During the morning, two more rockets launched from Gaza hit the city of Beersheba; one of the rockets hit a school, causing severe damage to the building, but no casualties, as Israeli authorities instructed schools to remain closed. Two rockets landed in the Israeli city of Ashkelon, causing light injuries to two people; another rocket hit the town of Ofakim; several more landed around these cities and the cities of Kiryat Gat, Kiryat Malachi and Ashdod. Altogether, more than 60 Katyusha and Qassam rockets were fired from Gaza into Israel.

According to UN humanitarian coordinator Max Gaylard, Gaza's hospitals were facing severe strain dealing with "their largest ever trauma caseloads under some of the most adverse conditions imaginable". Douglas Alexander, Britain's International Development Secretary is quoted saying "Thousands are suffering. Medical items are in short supply. Fuel shortages have led to power cuts which in turn are affecting hospitals and other essential services. And UN stocks of food are very low. The limited aid that is getting through cannot be distributed properly because of bombing from the air and rocket attacks launched from inside Gaza". A seriously injured six-year-old Palestinian boy was allowed to be transferred from Gaza to an Israeli children's hospital for treatment.

Israel rejected international appeals proposed by the French Foreign Minister Bernard Kouchner to grant a 48-hour cease-fire, saying that conditions were not right for the ceasefire. Meanwhile, Hamas spokesman Ayman Taha told the AFP agency that Hamas is open to any ceasefire proposition that will end the Israeli airstrikes and stop the Gaza blockade. Palestinian president Mahmoud Abbas, threatened to halt peace talks if they go against the Palestinian interests and offer support for "aggression".

In a briefing to the Israeli cabinet, Shin Bet Chief Yuval Diskin said that Hamas has suffered significant damage and its rule over Gaza has been compromised, and that many Hamas operatives are hiding in hospitals, posing as medical staff, or hiding in mosques and using them as headquarters, since they assumed Israel won't attack them there. According to the Israeli air force, Hamas cells have been firing rockets from within densely populated areas and attempting to use Palestinian civilians as human shields. Cells have been detected in neighborhoods in Gaza City, Jabalya, Khan Younis and Rafah. The Israel Defense Forces has distributed flyers to the Palestinian population in Gaza, warning civilians not to stay close to any Hamas related buildings, for their own safety. The Israeli Air Force bombed a Gaza Strip mosque. According to the IDF the mosque was used by Hamas as a storage site for missiles and explosive materials and that rocket cells were firing at Israel from the mosque area and from nearby sites. According to ynet, the attack on the mosque was carried out after legal consultation with IDF experts on international law.

Israel's supreme court, in response to a court petition heard the previous day, "gave the Israeli government until 10 a.m. Thursday to allow a small group of reporters into the Gaza Strip. The court warned that the reporters would be in the embattled area at their own risk". The ruling "went against a government decision six weeks ago to keep foreign reporters out of Gaza until rockets fired against Israel were halted".

Ninety-three trucks carrying medicine, medical supplies and food donated by Jordan and international organisations were allowed entry to the Gaza Strip, through the Kerem Shalom border crossing. The World Food Programme notified the IDF that it was not in need of any further food shipments, as its warehouses were filled to capacity.

Top UN aid officials urged Israel to allow for the resumption of fuel deliveries into the Gaza Strip, noting that the fuel shortage resulting from the suspension of deliveries had caused the main power plant in Gaza to shut down on 30 December, affecting 350,000 people in Central and Northern Gaza, who live with 16 hours or more of powercuts per day.

The United Nations Security Council met for two hours to hear statements from the Secretary General, the representatives of Palestine, Israel and the other members of the Council.

=== January ===
==== 1 January 2009 ====
Israeli air strikes hit Gaza's parliament building, and the offices of the education and justice ministries, leaving four dead and 25 wounded. A pre-dawn strike against the home of a Hamas operative resulted in the death of a Palestinian woman. Palestinian reports also mention missiles landed on a workshop and several money changers' offices, one of which was close to a children's hospital, slightly damaging it. In Rafah, air strikes destroyed five smuggling tunnels and a police command center, while in Gaza City, an alleged weapons manufacturing center and storage facility was destroyed. Dozens of Israelis received text messages from Hamas in the morning warning that the offensive on Gaza would only bring about massive rocket fire on Israel. According to Israeli military sources, Hamas launched more than 50 rockets into Israel without causing casualties. Rockets hit Beersheba and Ashdod, damaging a residential building in the latter city.

On 1 January, more than 30 rockets were fired from Gaza into Southern Israel. One of them hit Ashdod, and two hit Beersheba. On 2 January, Hamas fired more than 20 rockets into Israel, some of them hitting Ashkelon, with 20 more rockets being fired the next day.

An Israeli warplane dropped a one-ton bomb on the home of Nizar Rayan, a senior Hamas political leader, in the Jabaliya refugee camp, killing him, 9 women (including his four wives), his 11 children, and wounding another 30. As a liaison between the political and armed wings of Hamas and advocate of renewing suicide bombings, Rayan is the most senior political figure to be killed by Israel since 2004. According to the IDF, Rayan's house was used as an arms cache, a communications headquarters and concealed a tunnel's opening. The International Herald Tribune reported that among those killed were Rayan's four wives and nine of their twelve children. On 2 January, the Times Online reports instead that two of his four wives and four of his 12 children were killed. UN OCHA reports that 13 of his family members, including 11 of his children, were killed and 12 were injured. There were reports that the family was warned by the IDF to leave the building but that they had refused to do so. According to ynet, recent deliberations by the IDF resulted in a decision that striking homes used as weapons storages when sufficient warning is given to the residents falls within the boundaries of international law and is legitimate. Rayan had sent his son to carry out a suicide attack in the community of Elei Sinai in 2001 in which two Israelis were killed, and was behind the bombing in the Ashdod Port in 2004 which left 10 Israelis dead.

Ninety trucks carrying food and medical supplies provided by international organisations entered the Gaza Strip through the Kerem Shalom border crossing. Egypt blocked the entry of humanitarian aid from Qatar to pass through the Rafah crossing, however, Israel announced it would allow several aircraft from Qatar to land in Israel and the aid will be sent by truck to Gaza.

==== 2 January 2009 ====
Hamas called for a "Day of Wrath" against Israel, bringing thousands of protesters out onto the streets of Gaza and the West Bank. Israeli air strikes on Friday targeted the homes of 20 Hamas officials, including that of Imad Akel in Nuseirat and Mohammed Madhoun. One of the strikes in Khan Yunis killed five civilians. Israel began to bomb the ground near its boundary in an attempt to clear it of landmines, increasing speculation that a ground offensive was imminent. Israel briefly opened the Erez crossing to allow about 440 residents with foreign passports to leave the Gaza Strip. Foreign journalists continued to be barred entry to Gaza; those who had lined up at the Erez crossing intending to enter after a court decision supported their right to do so when the crossing is open, were turned back by Israeli authorities. At around 10:45, in a repeat attack south-west of Deir al-Balah, an International Red Cross and Red Crescent Movement ambulance, which had arrived to transport survivors following an initial attack, was destroyed by a second Israeli attack. The two crew members in the ambulance were injured and hospitalised.

Throughout the day, thirty rockets were fired at Israel; three people were lightly injured, and several buildings sustained heavy damage. In Jerusalem, men under the age of 50, or those who didn't hold Israeli ID were unable to access prayers in Al-Aqsa.

==== 3 January 2009 ====
Through 3 January 2009, Israel Air Force had flown 555 fighter sorties and 125 helicopter missions. Hundreds of unmanned aerial vehicle (UAV) flight hours were logged. They claimed to have destroyed more than 500 targets including one-third of the underground passages built by Hamas and other militant groups to smuggle and store rockets, weaponry, and other supplies. Throughout the initial stages of the air operation, the IDF transmitted messages to civilians in Gaza to stay away from Kassam launch sites and Hamas buildings and infrastructure.

Thirteen Palestinians, including six children, were killed and dozens wounded when the Israeli Air Force bombed the Maqadna Mosque in Beit Lahiya, in which about 200 people had gathered for evening prayers. Witnesses said over 200 Palestinians were praying inside at the time. Another person was killed as the American International School in Gaza was destroyed.

A senior commander of Hamas' armed wing, Abu Zakaria al-Jamal was killed. He was commander of Gaza City's rocket-launching squads. In another air strike, Jamal Mamduch, commander of the Gaza City battalion, was killed. Many of the killed Hamas leaders died along with their families in their own homes.

At least 34 rockets were fired at Israel during the day, damaging several buildings, and lightly injuring one woman in Netivot. A number of Hamas rockets hit the city of Beersheba (population 186,000) in southern Israel, with one exploding on an empty school. Four Israelis had been killed by rockets fired from Gaza since the beginning of IAF attacks.

Israel launched its first artillery strikes. Israel had at this point carried out more than 700 strikes on Gaza since launching the offensive a week prior, according to AFP.

The UN warned of a worsening humanitarian crisis, and reported that at least 100 of the more than 400 Palestinians killed by Israel at this point were women and children.

On the evening of 3 January, Israeli ground troops entered Gaza. The intention of the ground invasion, according to the Israeli Defense Forces website, was to secure areas within the Gaza Strip from which rockets had been launched after previous Israeli operations.

The United Nations Security Council held another closed-door meeting which failed to produce an official statement or an on-the-record debate or vote on a resolution. Speaking outside the meeting, the President of the General Assembly Miguel d'Escoto Brockmann said "Once again, the world is watching in dismay the dysfunctionality of the Security Council."

==== 4 January 2009 ====
Israeli ground troops entered Beit Lahiya and Beit Hanoun in northern Gaza in the early hours. Israeli forces bisected Gaza and surrounded Gaza City, but reportedly restricted their movements to areas that were not heavily urbanised. The Israeli military said forty sites had been targeted, including targets for weapons depots and rocket launch sites. Despite a Supreme Court ruling to allow a limited number of journalists into the warzone, Israel refused to allow journalists into the area. Heavy fighting was reported near Gaza City. The IDF reported that 30 of its soldiers were wounded, 28 from a single mortar shell which landed next to a Golani regiment, with two out of those 30 badly injured. One later died of his wounds. Israel claimed that at least 50 Hamas fighters were killed in the incursion and dozens more were wounded. The Israeli soldier killed was identified as 22-year-old Sergeant Dvir Emanuelof. Palestinian medical sources said that at least 21 Palestinians were killed in the fighting. Additionally, Palestinian health ministry officials stated that at least 17 people were killed and 130 injured when Israeli shells fell near a school and the main market in Gaza City. A tank shell fired in northern Gaza killed 12 people, apparently including civilians. An Israeli missile hit a house in the Shuja'iyya neighborhood, killing a mother and her four children. In the morning, an ambulance operating out of Al-Awda hospital in the northern city of Beit Lahiya was shelled, seriously injuring 4 medical staff. At least 41 rockets and mortars were fired into Israel. Three Israeli civilians were lightly wounded.

Three senior Hamas leaders were killed on Sunday: Hussam Hamdan, who according to the IDF was responsible for the organisation's rocket fire and the man behind the firing of Grad missiles towards the cities of Beersheba and Ofakim; Muhammad Hilou, who according to the IDF was responsible for Hamas' special forces in Khan Younis and for the firing of long-range rockets; and Mohammed Shalpokh, who commanded Hamas forces in Rafah.

Also on 4 January, the director of Israel's internal security agency, the Shin Bet, told the cabinet that Hamas leaders both at home and in exile felt that their organisation was facing an "existential threat" and was "willing to reach an agreement" on a ceasefire. However, Foreign Minister Tzipi Livni said that Israel did not intend to conclude a "diplomatic product" with Hamas. Such a move had been avoided in the past out of fear of legitimising Hamas as a negotiating partner.

Hamas sources told The Jerusalem Post that members of al-Aqsa Martyrs' Brigades, the Popular Resistance Committees, Islamic Jihad and the Popular Front for the Liberation of Palestine were participating in the fighting against the IDF, and that they were making use of U.S. and Israeli weapons confiscated from members of Fatah in the 2007 Battle of Gaza.

According to medical sources, the total Palestinian death toll for the day was 42, most of them civilians.

Fatah officials in Ramallah told The Jerusalem Post that Hamas militiamen had been assaulting many Fatah activists since the beginning of the operation last Saturday. They said at least 75 activists were shot in the legs while others had their hands broken. Meanwhile, sources close to Hamas revealed over the weekend that the movement had "executed" more than 35 Palestinians who were suspected of collaborating with Israel and were being held in various Hamas security installations.

The New York Times reported that Israelis fired tank shells into a house in the Tuffah district, and that early on the 4th, in the crowded Shati refugee camp near the coast, a shell fired from a navy ship hit another house; there were no survivors.

===== Zeitoun killings =====
The Daily Telegraph reported that in the Zeitoun district, early in the morning of 4 January, Israeli troops evacuated about 110 members of the Samouni, an extended family clan, into a Samouni-owned warehouse, where they waited without running water or food for 24 hours. Starting at 6:35am on the 5th, the house was repeatedly shelled. Some were killed inside the building by falling masonry; although the rest attempted to flee the building, the majority of the dead were killed outside, by shrapnel. Initial reports were of 60 to 70 killed; the UN count of the total killed was 30, with 11 Samouni family members dead. A few survivors, some wounded, others carrying some of the dead or dying, managed to reach Gaza's main north-south road where passing cars stopped to take them to the hospital. A Red Crescent volunteer said that injured people were left behind: "we could not get to them and it was no longer safe for us to stay."

According to the Red Cross, ambulances were not given permission to enter the neighborhood to retrieve the injured from the building until a day later. The United Nations confirmed these reports on 9 January Three children later died after they were transported to hospital. Reports of the incident were given to the media by Norwegian doctors stationed in the Shifa Hospital, Gaza, as early as Tuesday, 5 January.

B'Tselem, an Israeli human rights group, alleged that Israeli forces had not done their duty to prevent civilian casualties by assisting the wounded. 48 hours after the attack, ICRC ambulances searching 100 yards from where Israeli soldiers were stationed found four children, too weak to move, that had taken refuge near corpses believed to be those of their family. "The ICRC believes that in this instance the Israeli military failed to meet its obligation under international humanitarian law to care for and evacuate the wounded," said a statement from the International Red Cross and Red Crescent, and called the delay considers the delay in granting access "unacceptable".

Other buildings were reported as being shelled during the incident, and IDF infantry reportedly fired on an occupied house The survivors of the incident were treated at Shifa hospital, Gaza.

The IDF stated that it had no knowledge of the incident, and that "IDF forces had not yet reached the areas in question" by 4 January. An Israeli army spokesman said there was no record of a "specific attack on a specific target", nor had the army massed civilians in specific locations. "This does not rule out exchanges of fire but it does rule out targeting of a specific building," he said. Israel said there is not a humanitarian crisis in Gaza and that it is working with international agencies and doing what it can to reduce civilian casualties.

The UN's OCHA said that if it was true it was "one of the gravest incidents" in the conflict, and called for an investigation into the incident, but did not make any "accusations of deliberate action" at the time. United Nations High Commissioner for Human Rights, Navanethem Pillay, said the Zeitoun Samouni incident "appears to have all the elements of war crimes." Pillay called for "credible, independent and transparent" investigations into possible violations of humanitarian law.

==== 5 January 2009 ====
As Israeli tanks and troops seized control of large parts of the Gaza Strip, tens of thousands of Gazans fled their homes amidst artillery and gunfire, and flooded into the heart of Gaza City. Gun battles reportedly broke out between Israel and Hamas on the streets of Gaza, as Israeli forces surrounded the city. BBC reporters stated that the battles were preventing essential medical supplies from reaching hospitals and casualties.

An airstrike hit an ambulance, killing three paramedics. Israeli tank shelling killed at least 24 civilians in the Gaza Strip, 13 of them children. A family of seven were killed by an Israeli airstrike in al-Shati Camp east of Gaza City. In Gaza's Zaytun neighborhood, seven members of another family were killed and in separate incident, a pregnant Palestinian woman and her four children were killed.

Media reported that Israel was using the controversial substance white phosphorus over civilian targets during the course of its military operation. Some media reported that Israel used the substance as a smokescreen. Israel used white phosphorus in Lebanon in 2006, and the UK and the US have used it elsewhere. Israel denied using the substance. According to Ha'aretz and the UN humanitarian chief, Israel had also used cluster bombs.

Hamas said it would send a delegation to Egypt for talks, as France spearheaded diplomatic efforts to obtain a 48-hour truce. Israel continued to refuse to let journalists enter the Gaza Strip, despite a ruling from the Israeli Supreme Court to admit a limited number of reporters.

Over 40 Qassam and Grad rockets were fired from Gaza at southern Israel striking Ashkelon, Ashdod, Sderot, Kiryat Malakhi, near Ofakim, Netivot and Beersheba. Hamas also fired rockets at the area between Ashdod and Gedera.

Hamas said they have killed 9 Israeli fighters. Hamas also said they have captured two Israeli soldiers. Israel dismissed the claims, accusing Hamas of engaging in "psychological warfare". By evening, the Israeli Defense Forces said that during the course of the day they had killed between 80-100 Hamas fighters in ground fighting, and that a further 100 "wanted gunmen" had been taken prisoner. Palestinian cells fired nearly 40 rockets and mortar shells at Israel, injuring four Israelis.

An IDF spokesperson stated that three Israeli soldiers were killed in a friendly fire incident after erroneously identifying Israeli soldiers as "terrorists." About 20 soldiers were injured in the incident. Another IDF officer was reported killed in a separate friendly fire incident.

UN officials published a report which stated that an Israeli airstrike on the grounds of a UN school, which was serving as a makeshift refugee camp for hundreds of displaced Palestinians, killed three Palestinian men. An official from the Danish charitable organization DanChurchAid reported that three mobile clinics set up to help hospitals in Gaza cope with the wounded were bombarded in Israeli airstrikes, despite being clearly marked as humanitarian vehicles.

A total of 30 Palestinian civilians were known to have been killed on 5 January, and the total Palestinian death toll at the end of the day was 540, until details of the Samouni family incident (below) emerged several days later.

==== 6 January 2009 ====
According to Palestinian sources, 20 people were killed in a number of IDF attacks. Medical workers reported that an attack on Deir al-Balah and the Bureij refugee camp killed ten Palestinians, including a father and his three children. An IDF soldier was killed and four wounded in an ambush in northern Gaza City. The IDF soldiers returned fire, killing all of the Hamas fighters. The IDF soldier killed was identified as Alexander Mashevitzky. According to Ynet, the head of Hamas' artillery forces and a senior member of Hamas' military wing, Ayman Siam, were both hit and believed to have been killed in an aerial attack in the Jabaliya neighborhood in the northern Gaza Strip.

At least 30 rockets were fired into Israel from Gaza. Gedera, 30 kilometres (19 mi) south of Tel Aviv, was hit for the first time. A Grad rocket landed near a house, lightly injuring a 3-month old girl.

"There's nowhere safe in Gaza", said John Ging, the UN's senior official in Gaza. "Everyone is terrorized and traumatized." He spoke of 1 million Palestinians without electricity and 700,000 without water, challenging world leaders to undergo similar privations until they had stopped the fighting: "You are not to sleep, eat or drink until you stop the killing of innocent people in the Gaza Strip".

Israel continued to refuse foreign journalists' access to the Gaza Strip. The continuing ban on foreign media access drew criticism from journalists that Israel was trying to "manage" the story. Israel said that opening border crossings for journalists would endanger staff at the terminals. While the Associated Press and some other news organizations have Palestinian reporters, photographers and cameramen based in Gaza, many media outlets have no reliable source of independent information.

Medics report that an Israeli airstrike on a 4-story building in Gaza City the night before had killed 12 members of the same extended family; the bodies of 7 children aged one to twelve years old, 3 women and 2 men from the Daya family were pulled from the rubble on Tuesday.

Senior Israeli defense officials said that Hamas had set up independent hospitals, and had stolen Israeli aid supplies.

A senior IDF officer said that "tunnels, weapons, anti-aircraft missiles, grenades, explosive devices, and weapons prepared for future attacks, such as motorbikes intended for kidnapping," had been found; the officer also stated that booby-trapped homes had been encountered, and that a booby-trapped mosque had been blown up.

The United Nations Security Council held a four-hour meeting in New York attended by Mahmoud Abbas, President of the Palestinian National Authority, the UN Secretary-General, David Miliband (foreign secretary of the United Kingdom), and Condoleezza Rice (US Secretary of State), where all sides stated their view of the situation.

===== UNRWA school Incident =====
Palestinian medics in Gaza stated, and news agencies worldwide reported, that 43 people were killed in an Israeli strike on an UNRWA school. The UN clarified in February that the shells had struck outside the school, not within the compound. Maxwell Gaylord (the UN humanitarian coordinator in Jerusalem) said that the UN "would like to clarify that the shelling and all of the fatalities took place outside and not inside the school." John Ging, UNRWA's operations director in Gaza stated he had been misquoted by the Jerusalem Post and other newspapers as saying that shells had hit the school, and that the UNRWA's earliest report on 6 January was correct in saying that shells had hit outside it.

Two tank shells exploded outside the school, spraying shrapnel on people inside and outside the building, where at least 350 Palestinians had sought refuge from fighting between Israelis and Palestinians. The strike took place near the Al-Fakhura school in Jabaliya in northern Gaza and was the third deadly Israeli attack near United Nations-run schools on 6 January.

The IDF said mortars from inside the school were fired at Israeli forces, and that Israeli soldiers were responding to them. The IDF also stated that bodies of militants were found inside the school afterwards. Time magazine reported, "The IDF gave the names of two Hamas combatants it says were killed inside the school — Imad and Hassan Abu Askar — who allegedly fired the mortars. But the IDF did not explain how it was able to identify them among the many casualties. Troops did not visit the school after the attack, nor did the IDF have access to a casualty list from Gaza's hospitals.". Nevertheless, Col. Moshe Levi (head of the IDF's Gaza Coordination and Liaison Administration) said, in February 2009, that 12 were the Palestinians killed in the incident - nine Hamas operatives and three noncombatants. Hamas rejected the claims of any fire from the school, calling them "baseless".

UNRWA spokesperson Christopher Gunness stated that the IDF later admitted in closed-door meetings that the fire they responded to was from outside the school. He noted that the UN buildings that had been fired upon displayed the UN flag, and that the UN had provided GPS coordinates of UN schools sheltering civilians to the IDF. Days earlier Gunness had said that the UNRWA was "99.9% certain" that there were no terrorists or military activity in the school, adding that this "does not necessarily contradict Israel's claim that the militants were operating close by".

Palestinian President Mahmoud Abbas was said by an aide to be investigating the option of bringing the incident before international courts.

The day of the attack, the UN requested an inquiry into both the assault and the Israeli allegations about terrorists firing from its schools. Ban Ki-moon condemned the attack, saying it was "totally unacceptable."

==== 7 January 2009 ====
At least 12 Palestinians were killed in fresh strikes in the Gaza Strip. At least 15 rockets hit Israel, causing no casualties.

Following the strikes, Israel initiated a three-hour "humanitarian" truce. The Israeli army refrained from attacks from 1 to 4 pm, though there were reports of exchanges of fire between Israeli forces and Hamas during that period. During the temporary truce, 80 aid trucks were allowed to enter the Strip, some of which delivered industrial fuel to Gaza's power plant. Access was granted to previously closed regions, to allow residents access to supplies. According to Israeli sources, they planned to repeat this move daily. Fighting resumed immediately following the end of the truce.

Despite the parties’ agreement to halt fighting during aid deliveries, a UN convoy was fired upon, killing an aid worker and wounding two others. Israeli tank fire was mentioned as the cause of the incident, but the IDF denied responsibility. Soldiers contended that Hamas snipers had targeted the aid workers. An Israeli medic said the wounded were saved by the Israelis, while the Palestinian Red Crescent Society denied it and said it had evacuated the victims. The Jerusalem Post wrote that the two wounded Palestinians had gunshot wounds and probably were hit by Hamas gunfire. While the UNRWA director acknowledged he could not be absolutely certain that the attacks came from IDF forces, an UNRWA spokesman blamed the Israelis for sending mixed contradicting messages As a result of the incident, the UN briefly suspended aid shipments but resumed them on 9 January after receiving assurances from Israel that they were not being targeted.

==== 8 January 2009 ====
At least two dozen Israeli airstrikes were reported, in which at least 4 Palestinians were killed and at least 22 wounded. UN officials said at least one driver in a UN aid convoy was killed after the convoy was fired upon by Israeli forces. The UN said the attack happened in spite of co-ordinating its movements with the IDF. It subsequently said it would suspend all relief activities in Gaza until it had received guarantees of the safety of its staff from Israel.

Israel announced the deaths of three soldiers: Roi Rosner, Amit Robinson, and Omer Rabinovitch, bringing the total number of soldiers killed to eight. Israel also claimed that many Hamas fighters were killed.

Three Katyusha rockets from Lebanon territory were fired at the northern Israeli city of Nahariyya. Two civilians were injured. The IDF returned fire at the launch sites in southern Lebanon. No one claimed responsibility for the attack.

The United Nations Security Council met and passed a resolution "stressing the urgency of and calls for an immediate, durable and fully respected ceasefire, leading to the full withdrawal of Israeli forces from Gaza", and welcoming the Egyptian initiative, among other points. While the United States abstained on the vote, Condoleezza Rice explained to the Council that the U.S. thought it important to see the outcomes of the Egyptian mediation efforts in order to see what the resolution might have been supporting, but that "after a great deal of consideration, we decided that the resolution -- the text of which we support, the goals of which we support and the objectives of which we fully support -- should indeed be allowed to go forward."

The order to abstain on the resolution, which U.S. diplomats had helped to draft, reportedly came at the last minute from President Bush, following pressure from the Israeli government, who issued a statement that the resolution was "not practical". In an unusually public rebuke, the Israeli Prime Minister boasted of how he had phoned up President Bush while Bush was in the middle of a speech, and how the incident left Rice "pretty embarrassed".

==== 9 January 2009 ====
The Israeli offensive continued, despite the passing of a UN Security resolution calling for an immediate and durable ceasefire.

Israel dismissed the Security Council resolution as "impractical": Ehud Olmert's office said that more Hamas rockets "only prove that the U.N.'s decision is not practical and will not be kept in practice by the Palestinian murder organizations."

Hamas objected to not being consulted during the drafting of the resolution: "Nobody consulted Hamas or talked to Hamas. Nobody put Hamas in the picture and yet Hamas is required to accept it. This is unacceptable," Mohammed Nazzal, a senior Hamas official based in Syria, told Al-Arabiya television.

At least 30 rockets were fired at southern Israel. Hamas claimed to have hit the Tel Nof airbase, some 27 kilometres (17 mi) from Tel Aviv, which, if true, would make it the farthest strike to date. Hamas also announced that Mahmoud Abbas' term as President had expired, and that while they do not expect Abbas to step down while the war continues in Gaza, they no longer recognize his legitimacy. Abbas responded that he still had another year, citing a law that says presidential and parliamentary elections should be held at the same time.

Condoleezza Rice said that it was "difficult" to protect civilians in a place as densely populated as Gaza — an area 25 miles (40 km) long and roughly six miles wide. A UN report on Gaza noted that "the borders are closed, making this one of the rare conflicts where civilians have no place to flee."

A three-hour truce took place on 9 January. Palestinians fired three Grad-type rockets at Ashdod, shortly after 1 pm, the truce's start-time. While supplies were being transferred through Kerem Shalom border crossing, Palestinians fired several mortar shells at the terminal. No casualties were reported.

The UN said its aid workers would resume movement, having received assurances from Israel that they were not being targeted.

At around 23:00, an Israeli drone destroyed a Norwegian People's Aid (NPA) car that was clearly marked with the NPA logo, outside the home of an NPA employee, Mahmoud Hamada, at al-Shati refugee camp in northern Gaza. Nobody was injured. Surrounding buildings were severely damaged. The Secretary-General of NPA, Petter Eide, said that there are no military targets in the area. Raymond Johansen of the Norwegian Ministry of Foreign Affairs stated that the incident was a "clear violation of international law."

==== 10 January 2009 ====
No rockets were fired into Israel overnight, a sharp drop from the dozens of projectiles that were launched in the early days of the offensive; during the morning, three rockets struck the southern city of Ashkelon, lightly wounding two people. Six additional rockets landed in open areas, with no casualties.

The Israeli military said that in Gaza it had killed more than 15 terrorists and that IDF aircraft had attacked more than 40 targets throughout Gaza striking ten rocket-launching sites, weapons-storage facilities, smuggling tunnels, an anti-aircraft missile launcher and gunmen. Although Palestinian hospital officials could confirm only four deaths they also stated that fighting has hindered paramedics from collecting bodies and treating the wounded. Palestinian medical officials said that eight people were killed by Israeli tank fire Saturday in the town of Jebailiya and the dead appeared to be civilians per paramedics on the scene.

The Israeli military said it would halt the fire in Gaza for three hours on Saturday to allow the territory's besieged residents to leave their homes and stock up on supplies. Medics use the lull to rescue casualties in areas of fighting, and aid groups also rush through food distribution.

The Palestinian Authority president urged both Israel and Hamas to agree to an Egypt-brokered truce Saturday, but he singled out Israel, saying it would be responsible for a "waterfall of blood" if it didn't accept the deal.

On 10 January the IDF stated that Hamas fighters are suffering from exhaustion. An IDF military commander said that Hamas militants are beginning to desert battle and refuse orders. Israeli military claims that Hamas younger operatives refused to venture outside to lob mortars against Israeli forces, prompting a senior Hamas leader, Amir Mansi, to operate the mortar himself. After IDF soldiers identified the source of fire, they shot and killed Mansi, wounding two others involved in the attack. Amir Mansi has been reported as an expert in the Grad rocket launching program, having been trained by Hezbollah. Also, the IDF stated that more than 300 Hamas fighters have been killed so far in the operation, the highest estimate so far, and at least 120 have been captured. According to the reports, entire Hamas companies have been eliminated by the Israeli forces. A senior Israeli officer said that "complete battalions that have just been erased", adding that Hamas fighters are afraid to come out to fight, with many going AWOL and abandoning the battlefield.

==== 11 January 2009 ====
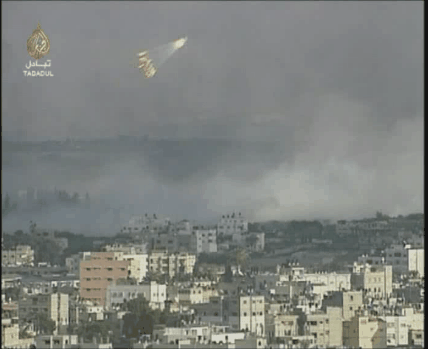
Phosphorus cluster bombs dropped on populated areas on 11 January

The IAF attacked overnight a mosque in the town of Rafah, which according to Israel was being used as a Hamas training camp, a meeting place and a weapons cache. The IDF reported that the mosque contained machine-guns and anti-aircraft missiles.

Israeli and Palestinian officials report that at least 40 Hamas gunmen were killed in a battle with IDF soldiers in the Gaza City neighborhood of Sheikh Ajalin. According to reports, Hamas and Islamic Jihad terrorists ambushed IDF forces in Sheikh Ajalin, which led to "some of the heaviest fighting" since phase two of the operation began. Palestinians reported that four people had been killed in the northern town of Beit Lahiya. The IDF reported hitting dozens of gunmen across the Gaza Strip on 10 January and 11. Additionally, the IAF reported that Hamas operatives have tried to shoot down an IAF fixed wing aircraft with anti-aircraft missiles for the first time since operation in Gaza begun.

Two rockets landed in the city of Beersheba, a half an hour before the city's high schools were to reopen after being closed for more than 10 days. Some 65% of Beersheba's 11 and 12th graders (about 2.700 students) were to return to school and study in bomb shelters.

Two terrorists and a woman were killed by Israeli strikes in the southern Gaza Strip. Dozens were injured in attacks near the village of Khouza to the east of Khan Younis. Palestinian medics in the area said that the injured suffered from burns and gas inhalations, symptoms indicating exposure to white phosphorus. Israel rejected the claim.

There have been rumors circulating in the Egyptian media that IAF strikes have wounded the captive Israeli soldier Gilad Shalit. A spokesman of Hamas politburo, Mousa Abu Marzook, said that Shalit's condition is no longer a concern for Hamas. An Israeli Defense Ministry official dismissed the comments as "psychological warfare". Vice Premier Haim Ramon in an interview with Army Radio added that Hamas is using Shalit as a "bargaining chip" hoping for the release of hundreds of Palestinian prisoners in exchange for the captured soldier.

On 11 January, the IDF started to deploy thousands of reservists into the Gaza Strip for the first time since Israeli offensive against Hamas begun 16 days ago. The Israeli government announced that it had approved tens of thousands of call-ups of its reserve forces before the ground operation started on 3 January. The troops have been refreshing on their urban training since then, and the bulk of the fighting has been done by Golani and Givati brigades. Analysts comment that this suggests Israel is intensifying its military efforts against Hamas.

An Israeli patrol came under fire on the Syrian border on Sunday. The soldiers did not return fire and no casualties were reported, although the vehicle they were traveling in sustained damage. The IDF assessed that the Syrian army was not involved, believing it was Palestinians protesting the Gaza operation. It was the second cross-border attack in three days after three Katyusha rockets were fired into northern Israel on 8 January from Lebanon. Israel filed a complaint to the UNDOF in Syria which sent a team to investigate the reports.

The IDF reported that it had uncovered an explosive device rigged with a timer that was hidden in a Palestinian school. A fuse attached to the explosives extended to a zoo located dozens of yards away. The soldiers managed to neutralize the bomb before it went off. According to the IDF, numerous weapons, including RPG launchers, grenades and AK-47 assault rifles were found inside the school.

In the afternoon, during the "humanitarian corridor" - a time in which the Israeli army holds it fire and allows civilians in Gaza to receive aid - Hamas operatives fired several rocket barrages. A rocket fired from the northern Gaza Strip hit a wall surrounding a kindergarten in Ashdod. There were no reports of damage or injury, but a few people were treated for shock. Other rockets were fired at Ashkelon, Sderot, Kiryat Malachi, and Eshkol Regional Council.

==== 12 January 2009 ====
On 12 January, four Israeli paratroopers were wounded in northern Gaza. A unit of Israeli paratroopers also discovered a Hamas tunnel, and shot and killed a female would-be suicide bomber. Israeli ground troops and aircraft targeted over 25 Hamas sites, including tunnels and weapons caches, killing four Hamas fighters and five civilians. Israeli forces continued their advance, with reports of fierce fighting around Gaza City. Airstrikes continued across the strip.

On 12 January, the IDF reported that it had started deploying reserve forces in Gaza.

The IDF reported on 12 January that four soldiers were wounded, one seriously. The troops were part of a paratrooper unit that was operating in northern Gaza. The military said they launched an inquiry whether this incident was caused by friendly fire. According to previous reports friendly fire has so far killed four soldiers in separate incidents on 5 January. Hamas' armed wing, the Ezzedine al-Qassam Brigade, claimed to have destroyed two Israeli tanks in the Gaza City neighborhood of Zeitun, and that they killed many soldiers in the town of Khuz'a, near the Israeli border. The Israeli army refuted these claims. Another paratrooper unit discovered and eventually destroyed a tunnel in Gaza that, according to the IDF, was meant to transfer suicide bombers into Israel. The tunnel was found some 300 meters from the fence on the border with Israel. It was also reported that the soldiers shot and killed a female would-be suicide bomber. During the day the military, backed by the IAF, targeted over 25 sites on Monday, including tunnels and weapon caches, killing 9 Palestinians, five of whom, according to Palestinian officials, were civilians.

US President George W. Bush threw his support behind Israel once more on 12 January. The President was quoted with saying that he believes a sustainable ceasefire will only be achieved if Hamas stops firing rockets at Israel and that it is solely Hamas' choice to make. He reiterated Israel's right to defend herself but hoped she "continued to be mindful of the innocent folk" and help with humanitarian aid transfer into Gaza. Meanwhile, it was reported that Hamas raided over 100 trucks with humanitarian aid meant for civilians and sold it to the highest bidder. Israeli forces stopped several attempts to smuggle prohibited goods into Israel, namely electronics, since Defense Minister Ehud Barak said they do not classify as humanitarian aid. Israel still allows certain repair items to flow into Gaza to repair the damaged electric grid.

Israel is considering establishing a field hospital outside of the Gaza Strip to facilitate medical aid for Palestinians civilians wounded in the conflict between Israel and Hamas. Under the plan, Israel is also considering bringing the facility inside the Palestinian territory to make it more accessible for the Palestinians seeking treatment. The hospital would be run by the IDF Medical Corps. Throughout the conflict, IDF has allowed the passage of over 900 trucks and facilitated with the transfer of over 20,000 tons of basic food and supplies.

As the Palestinian death toll exceeded 900, in a statement the IDF said it believes 400 of those are known Hamas fighters, adding that a "significant number are also Hamas operatives" in the remaining 500 dead.

==== 13 January 2009 ====
Israel's land, sea and air bombardment continues for an 18th day, with shelling and air raids hitting Gaza City, Rafah and elsewhere. Israel's military says it hit 60 targets overnight. Ground troops advance into the southern and eastern suburbs of Gaza City. The Israeli military says an officer and two soldiers are injured by an explosion in a booby-trapped house in the northern Gaza Strip.

An unidentified gunman opened fire at an Israeli Border Guard patrol from the Jordanian side of the border north of Eilat early Tuesday morning. The Border Guards returned fire. No one was injured in the incident, the first such shooting in more than a decade.

==== 14 January 2009 ====
Israel's bombardment continues for a 19th day, with overnight air raids on 60 targets, including 35 weapons-smuggling tunnels on the border with Egypt and an unknown number of rocket-launching sites. One air strike damages a cemetery in Gaza City. Israel was targeted from the Lebanese border. Israeli troops counterattacked. No casualties were reported on either side. A message, allegedly by Osama bin Laden, was released declaring Jihad on Israel.

==== 15 January 2009 ====
Israeli tanks and troops advance deep into Gaza City after an intense bombardment in the early hours, sending hundreds of terrified civilians into the streets to try to flee the fighting. Tonnes of aid go up in flames after Israeli artillery shells hit a UN compound. The Quds hospital is evacuated because of a fire caused by a tank shell. UN Secretary General Ban Ki-moon meets Israeli leaders to push for a ceasefire. He says the death toll, put at 1,100 by Gaza medical officials, has reached an "unbearable point".

Two rockets fired by Gaza militants on Thursday hit Be'er Sheva, wounding five people, including a 7-year-old boy who was seriously hurt. One of the rockets landed directly on a car.

In a battle near Jebaliya, an IDF soldier was killed and another was severely wounded. The IAF attacked over 15 sites, including rocket-launching sites and squads, gunmen, and a smuggling tunnel. The IDF also said that 40 Hamas operatives have been killed overnight.

Three senior members of Hamas, Said Seyam, the Hamas interior minister and his brother Ayad Seyam and an unidentified person was killed in an IAF strike on Ayad Seyam's house. 20 other people were reportedly injured in the same strike. Palestinian sources said that the head of Islamist terrorist group's security apparatus, Salah Abu Shreh, and its military commander in Gaza City, Mahmoud Watfah, were also killed in the attack. Hamas, despite the truce proposal, vowed revenge for the assassination of Seyam, who was one of the masterminds of the 2007 coup against the ruling party, Fatah and was the number three most sought Hamas leader after Ismail Haniyeh and Mahmoud Zahar. Shin Bet security agency, the Israeli equivalent of the FBI, were responsible for the intelligence leading to the airstrike that killed Seyam.

It is reported by several people, journalist and doctors that the Israeli army fired upon the UNRWA compound, schools, ambulances, hospitals and media offices. In response to this, Ban Ki-moon, UN secretary-general, has started a protest.

==== 16 January 2009 ====
The bodies of 23 Palestinians were pulled from the rubble in the Tel al-Hawa district of Gaza City after Israeli tanks withdraw in the pre-dawn hours. Palestinian medics say at least 1,155 Palestinians have died over the past three weeks.

Palestinian militants in the Gaza Strip on Friday, 16 January, fired over 15 rockets at southern Israel, leaving five Israelis wounded: a pregnant woman was hospitalized in Ashkelon after her home suffered a direct hit from a rocket; two were wounded in Ashdod - one moderately and the other lightly; earlier three Israelis sustained light wounds when two Grad rockets struck the southern town of Kiryat Gat; five rockets exploded in the Eshkol region in the morning.

==== 17 January 2009 ====
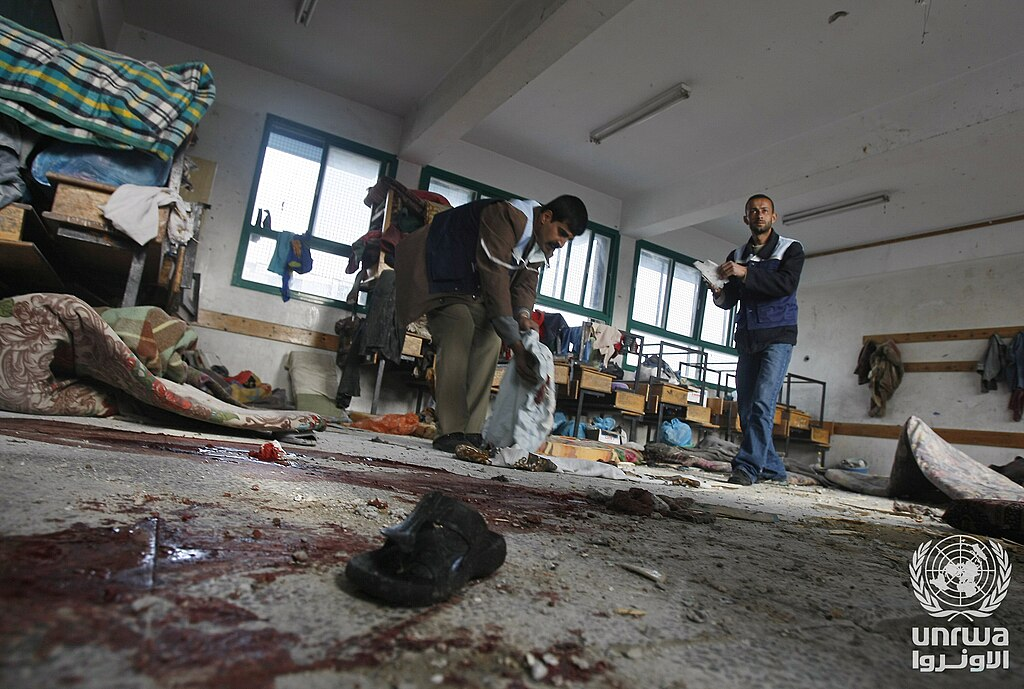
A UN school in Beit Lahiya damaged during an Israeli attack on 17 January

More than 50 air strikes were carried out in Gaza overnight, ahead of the expected vote by Israel's cabinet on a proposal for a ceasefire. Heavy explosions echoed south of Gaza City.

United Nations officials say two children, aged five and seven, were killed when Israeli tank fire hit a UN school where hundreds had taken shelter in the northern town of Beit Lahiya. A UN spokesman, Chris Gunness, said an investigation ought to be held "to determine whether a war crime has been committed". Israeli foreign ministry spokesman Yigal Palmor rejected the call, saying: "There's not the slightest piece of evidence to support such allegations."

==== 18 January 2009 ====
Israel implemented a unilateral cease-fire early Sunday and in announcing the cease-fire late Saturday, Prime Minister Ehud Olmert said Israel had achieved its goals and more, stating that "Hamas was hit hard, in its military arms and in its government institutions. Its leaders are in hiding and many of its men have been killed." According to Olmert's statement, the cease-fire went into effect at 2 a.m. local time (00.00 GMT) with the IDF warning that attacks on soldiers or civilians "will be met with a harsh response." If Hamas holds its fire, the military "will weigh pulling out of Gaza at a time that befits us," Olmert said. If not, Israel "will continue to act to defend our residents."

The first death after the cease-fire was a Palestinian farmer who was shot dead by Israeli soldier while checking his farm in Khan Younis, on 18 January morning. The Israeli army said they shot the farmer because he was approaching land occupied at that moment by Israeli ground troops.

Hamas fired ten rockets into Southern Israel, Israel responded with airstrikes.

Hamas made a televised announcement of a ceasefire issuing their own demands of Israeli withdrawal within a week, reopen Gaza border crossings, and provide aid.

==== 20 January 2009 ====
On Tuesday afternoon, Gaza gunmen fired at IDF patrols in two separate incidents near the Kissufim border crossing, in central Gaza, and in southern Gaza - IDF returned fire. No one was wounded and no significant damage was reported. Also, eight mortar shells were fired from the central Gaza Strip. Most shells apparently landed in Palestinian areas. IAF targeted and hit one of the mortar launchers. Shelling of mortars continued Tuesday night and 3-4 shells were fired at Eshkol Regional Council. No casualties were reported. On the same day, another Palestinian farmer was shot dead by the IDF while approaching his farm in Jabalia and two children were killed in an explosion of an Israeli bomb left behind in Gaza City.

==== 21 January 2009 ====
Early in the day, Israel said it had completed its troop pull-out from Gaza.

==== 22 January 2009 ====
In the wake of the conflict, Hamas accused rival Palestinian faction Fatah of spying for Israel. Fatah denied spying on Hamas for Israel, and party leaders said Thursday that at least 175 of their members had been rounded up and tortured in recent days.

== See also ==
- International reaction to the 2008-2009 Israel-Gaza conflict
- Media coverage of the Gaza War (2008–2009)
- Effects of the Gaza War (2008–2009)
- Incidents in the Gaza War (2008–2009)
- List of Israeli attacks on Gaza in 2009
- List of Palestinian rocket attacks on Israel in 2009
