= Fuad Kokaly =

Palestinian politician

- فؤاد كوكالي

Ambassador of the State of Palestine to Romania
- In office 2014–2021
- President: Mahmoud Abbas
- Preceded by: Ahmed Aql
- Succeeded by: Issam Tawfiq Masalha

Member of the Palestinian Legislative Council
- In office January 2006 – ?

Mayor of Beit Sahour
- In office August 2000 – May 2005
- Succeeded by: Hani Abdalmasih

Personal details
- Born: 1962 (age 62–63); Beit Sahour, West Bank
- Political party: Fatah
- Profession: Politician, Diplomat

Fuad Kokaly (Arabic: فؤاد كوكالي) is a Palestinian politician and diplomat. He was born in 1962 in Beit Sahour, in the West Bank. He was detained by Israeli forces during the crackdown on the Beit Sahour tax resistance. He was the mayor of Beit Sahour for several years, and is a member of the Interparliamentary Assembly on Orthodoxy. He also served as the head of the Fatah party in Bethlehem. He is a member of the Palestinian Legislative Council and formerly the ambassador of the State of Palestine to Romania.
