= Ghassan Andoni =

Palestinian physicist and activist

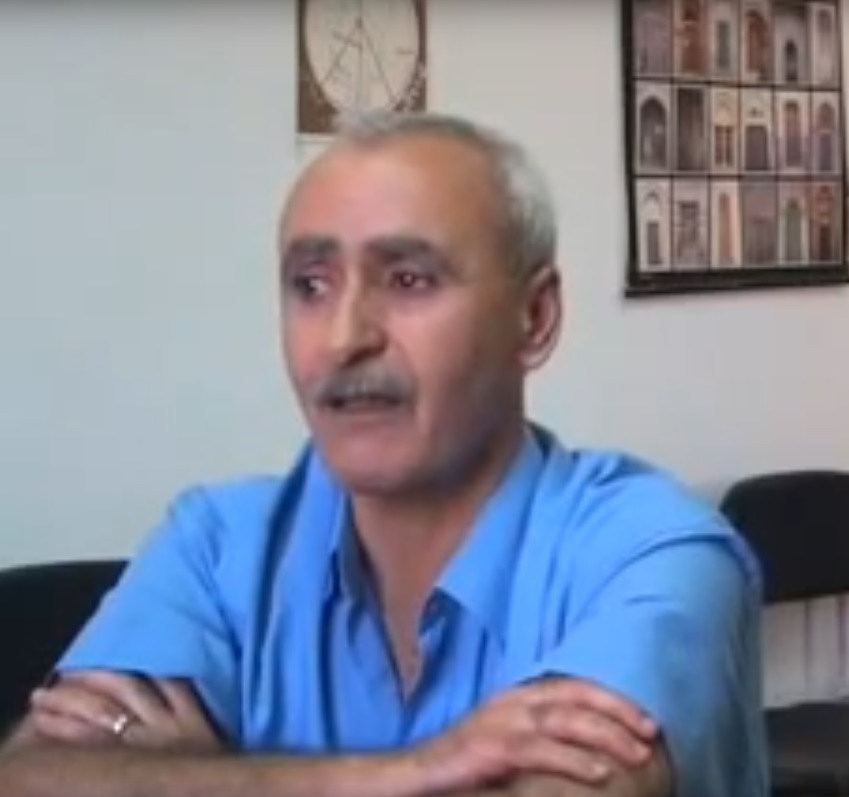
- Born: 1956 (age 69–70); Beit Sahour
- Citizenship: Palestinian
- Occupations: Physicist, professor, and peace activist

Academic background
- Education: University of Baghdad; University of Reading

Academic work
- Discipline: physics
- Institutions: Bir Zeit University
- Notable works: Peace Under Fire: Israel, Palestine and the International Solidarity Movement

Ghassan Andoni (Arabic: غسان أنضوني; born 1956) is a Palestinian activist.

Born in Beit Sahour to a Palestinian Christian family, he is a professor of physics at Bir Zeit University at the West Bank. He advocates nonviolent resistance in the Israeli-Palestinian conflict.

Andoni is co-founder of the International Solidarity Movement (ISM), founder of the International Middle East Media Centre and director of the Palestinian Center for Rapprochement between Peoples (PCR).

During the First Intifada Andoni was imprisoned for being involved in Beit Sahour's tax revolt. In 2006, he was nominated for the Nobel Peace Prize by the American Friends Service Committee along with Jeff Halper of the Israeli Committee Against House Demolitions (ICAHD).

== Bibliography ==
- Peace Under Fire: Israel, Palestine and the International Solidarity Movement, Editor, Verso Books (2004). ISBN 978-1844675012

== See also ==
- List of peace activists
