= Qustandi Shomali =

Palestinian academic

Qustandi Shomali (Arabic: قسطندي شوملي (born in Beit Sahour, Mandatory Palestine on 8 July 1946), is a Palestinian professor of history at Bethlehem University.

== His studies ==
He worked as an Arabic teacher in Algeria from 1965 to 1972; received a B.A. in Arabic literature from Oran University in Algeria in 1971, worked as editor of the Arab World Review in Canada from 1972 to 1975 and as translator for the Government of Quebec while also studying Comparative Literature at Montreal University, graduating with an MA in 1974; continued his studies in France and earned a Doctorate in Communication and Information Sciences from the University of Paris, Sorbonne.

== At Bethlehem University ==
In 1977, Shomali returned to Palestine and joined Bethlehem University, first as Assistant Professor (1977–80), then as chairman of the Arabic Language Department from 1980 to 1986, Associate Professor of Arabic (1983–2006) and full professor in June 2006. He was a visiting professor at Georgetown University during 1986-87 and at the Collège de France, France in 1995. Shomali was on the board of Directors of the Family Bookshop Group Holdings, Cyprus from 1992 to 1995 served as secretary of the Bethlehem 2000 Committee in 1995–96, was a visiting professor at the California State University, San Bernardino in 2004 and in 2011–2012.

== Prizes and honours ==
He has received prizes and honors including the Rashid Hussein Prize by the Arab Heritage Center in 1991, the "Medallion François 1er" from the Collège de France 1995, The Ghassan Kanafani Medallion in 1996 and the Bethlehem University Recognition Medal in 2002. He worked as a translator into Arabic, including The Master: A Life of Jesus (by John Pollock) Beirut, Dar al-Jil, (1999), wrote textbooks for teaching, articles and critical studies in Arabic, English and French, in local and international journals, on Modern Palestinian Literature, Comparative Literature and Media, including Introduction into Modern Linguistics, Jerusalem, Arab Studies Society, 1983, Literary and Critical Trends in Modern Palestinian Literature (Jerusalem, Dar al-Awdah, 1990).

Shomali was invited to lecture in universities in France, Belgium, Italy, England, Sweden, Germany, USA, Jordan, Tunisia, Morocco and Yemen. Moreover, He was invited (1995–2000) by the Ecole Doctorale des Sciences Economiques and Le Centre d'Etudes des Relations Internationales at the University of Reims, in France, to lecture on different aspects of the Palestinian culture.

Shomali spent 10 years (1985–1995) studying and classifying old Palestinian newspapers published before 1948. This resulted in the publication of a series of bibliographies and critical studies on Falastin, Mirat as-Sharq, al-Carmel and al-Akhbar (6 Volumes), and a critical study entitled "The Critical and Literary Trends in the Palestinian Literature", based on Falastin Newspaper.

As a professor of translation at Bethlehem University since 1995, Shomali has published articles on the Theory of Translation in international journals, as well as a textbook entitled An Introduction to Translation. He is a founder and member in the Palestinian Translators' Society since 1990.

== Writings ==
Shomali has written on Bethlehem and cultural tourism:

- Bethlehem 2000: A Guide to Bethlehem and its Surroundings. 1997. (translated into German, Spanish, French and Italian)
- Bethlehem 2000: Twenty Centuries of History; a catalogue in Arabic, French and English for a photographic exhibition on Bethlehem.
- A book entitled Cultural Tourism in Palestine (MAS.1999).
- Tourism, Cultural and Development, the Case of Palestine (1995), a study in English for UNESCO.
- He was a major contributor in the preparation of an illustrated book The Nativity in Bethlehem & Umbria.
- He also prepared a Visitors' Guide to the Ministry of Tourism and A Tourist Guide to Palestine.
- He wrote also a policy paper entitled: Cultural Tourism in Palestine: Policy, Resources & Products. West Bank & Gaza. UNESCO. March 2004, and
- a textbook entitled: Cultural Heritage and Tourism, Bethlehem University, 2005.
- Genealogy database for the Shomali Family in Palestine and Diaspora, 2013.

== Other published books ==
- The Arabic Typewriter. The Administrative Formation Center, Oran. 1970
- Work Opportunities for the Graduates in the West Bank Universities, Jerusalem: Arab Thought Forum, 1981.
- Introduction into Modern Linguistics, Jerusalem: Arab Studies Society, 1982, Second Edition, 1986, Third Edition, 1993.
- History of the La Sallian Institutions in the Middle East, Bethlehem University, 1984.
- The Arabic Press in Palestine: Bibliography of Literary & Cultural Texts. "Falastin" Newspaper (1911–1967). Volume I: Alphabetical Bibliography. Jerusalem: Arab Studies Society, 1990
- The Arabic Press in Palestine: Bibliography of Literary & Cultural Texts."Falastin" Newspaper (1911–1967). Volume II: Literary Genres. Jerusalem: Arab Studies Society, 1990.
- Literary and Critical Trends in Modern Palestinian Literature. Jerusalem: Dar al-Awdah for Studies and Publication, 1990.
- A Handbook for Writers of Research Papers. Jerusalem: Arab Studies Society, 1990, Second Edition 1996.
- The Arabic Press in Palestine:"Falastin" Newspaper (1911- 1967). Volume III, Chronological Bibliography. Jerusalem: Jerusalem Research Center, 1992.
- The Arabic Press in Palestine: Mir'at al-Sharq (Mirror of the East) 1919- 939. A Critical Study & Chronological Bibliography. Jerusalem: Arab Studies Society, 1992.
- Introduction to Translation. Jerusalem: Arab Studies Society, 1996
- The Arab Press in Palestine: al-Akhbar Newspaper 1909–1947. Jerusalem:Arab Studies Society, 1996.
- The Arab Press in Palestine: al-Carmel Newspaper 1908–1942. Jerusalem: al-Lika’Center, 1996.
- Tourism, Development and Culture. The Case of Palestine. World Decade for Cultural Development. UNESCO, 1995.
- Dialectics of Life & Death in the Poetry of Rashid Hussien. Taibeh: Arab Heritage Center, 1996. 120 pages.
- Cultural Tourism in the West Bank & Gaza. Ramallah: MAS, 1999.
- The Nativity in Bethlehem & Umbria. et al. AP& S, Perugia, 2000 (Arabic, English, Italian)
- Beit Sahour, the Shepherds Field, the Field of Ruth & Bir as-Syydah. Biet Sahour: al-Andalus Press, 2001
- Bibliography of Bethlehem. Center for Cultural Heritage Preservation. EuroMed Heritage II. Bethlehem, 2004. Published electronically on the website of Mediterranean voices.
- Names and Symbols in Modern Palestinian Literature. Ogarit Cultural Center, Ramallah, 2010
- The Living Stones. Bethlehem: Lasallian Educational Center, 2013.
- Palestinian Popular Heritage. Bethlehem: Al-Lika’ Center For Religious and Cultural Heritage, 2013

Shomali translated also the following books:

- Bethlehem Museum of Folklore. Arab Women Union. Franciscan Printing Press, Jerusalem, 1985
- Prix Gitelson Pour La Paix. Intervention de Mme Simone Veil. Jerusalem. May 1991.
- Open your Hearts to Mary Queen of Peace by Tomislave Vlasic, Rome, 1994. 230 pp.
- Bethlehem 2000 (Catalogue), 43 pp. 1995
- Frere Bernard-Edmond (A. Rock), 19 pp. 1996
- The Master. A Life of Jesus. By John Pollock. Beirut: Dar-al-Jil, 1999, 200 pp.
- The Gospel in Dostoyevsky. By Ernest Gordon. Beirut: Dar-al-Jil, 1999, 320 pp
- Krupp Bautechnik Operating Instruction. 1998, 60 pp..
- Drained. Stories of People who wanted more. By Johann Christoph Arnold. Farmington: The Plough Publishing House, 1999. 160 pp.
- "Ne a Bethléem" par Charles Singer. 1999.
- Stranger on the Road. By John Russell C. GoodSeed International, Durham, Canada, 2000, 370 pp.
- Journy of the Magi: A Pilgrimage for Peace. Holy Land Trust. Dec. 2000
- Justice and only Justice. A Palestinian Theology of Liberation. By Naim Stifan Ateek, 2002. 220 pp.
- Bethlehem University: Standing on Tradition..Reaching for the Future. Powerpoint presentation translated into French. May 2002.
- Theology of Land and Covenant. By Robert Davidson and David Sinclair. The Committee on Church & Nation. The Church of Scotland. Edinburgh, 2003
- Guide pour la conservation de la vieille ville de Naplouse. Etude de Faisabilite, par Ferial Fahoum, Unesco. December 2003.
- Fredrick Zuendel. The Awakening. One Man's Battle with Darkness. Farmington, the Plough Publishing House, 2007
- Endangered: Your Child in a Hostile World. By Johann Christoph Arnold. Plough Publishing House, Farmington, 2010
- ACE Encyclopedia : Media and Election, Cost of Registration and Election. IDEA, Stockholm. 2010

== Translation into English ==
- The Arab Women in Israel: Reality and Challenges. 2005
- Palestine: A Thirsty Land. Video Presentation. 2005
- Palestinian Women: The Pioneers. Women Affairs Task Force. Ramallah, Eyes Media, 2005
- Palestinian Short Stories. Pyalara, Palestinian Youth Association for Leadership and Rights Activation, Ramallah, 2009.
- “The Roles of the Palestinian Women in the 40s” Palestinian Women's Documentation Center, March 2011, 180 pp.
- The Achievements of Bethlehem Municipality Council 2005–2012, November 2012, 63 p.
