= Beit Sahour =

Palestinian town east of Bethlehem, West Bank

Beit Sahour بيت ساحور (Arabic)
- Municipality type B

Arabic transcription(s)
  - Arabic: بيت ساحور
  - Latin: Bayt Sāḥūr
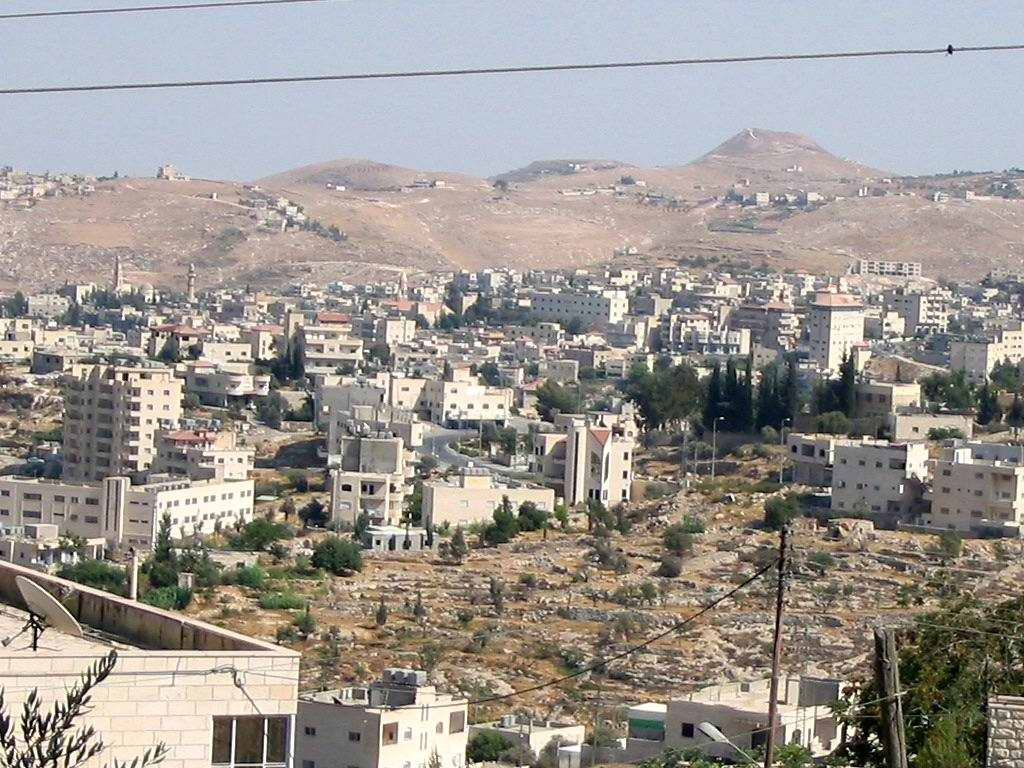
- Beit Sahour with the Herodium in the background

- Municipal seal of Beit Sahour

- Location of Beit Sahour within the West Bank Location of Beit Sahour within State of Israel
- Coordinates: 31°42′1″N 35°13′30″E
- State: State of Palestine
- Governorate: Bethlehem

Government
  - Type: Municipality
  - Head of Municipality: Hani Hayek

Area
  - Municipality type B: 6.9 km^{2} (2.7 sq mi)

Population (2017)
  - Municipality type B: 13,281
  - Density: 1,900/km^{2} (5,000/sq mi)
  - Metro: 97,559 (Bethlehem area)
- Name meaning: "House of vigilance", "house of the night watch", or "house of the magicians"
- Website: Beit Sahour Municipality

Beit Sahour or Beit Sahur (Arabic: بيت ساحور, romanized: Bayt Sāḥūr; Palestine grid 170/123) is a Palestinian town east of Bethlehem, in the Bethlehem Governorate of the West Bank in the State of Palestine. The city is under the administration of the Palestinian National Authority. The population was 13,281 in 2017, consisting of approximately 80% Christians (most of them Greek Orthodox) and 20% Muslims.

Christian tradition holds Beit Sahour to be the site of the Annunciation to the Shepherds. There are two enclosures in the eastern part of Beit Sahour that are claimed by different Christian denominations to be the actual 'Shepherds Field': one belonging to the Greek Orthodox Church, and the other, the Catholic site, belonging to the Franciscan Custody of the Holy Land.

The mainly Christian Palestinian inhabitants are being pressured by encroaching Israeli settlements, with one housing development threatened with demolition.

== Etymology ==
The name Beit Sahour has been translated variously as "House of the Magicians" by Palmer (1881), and more recently on Palestinian websites as "House of Vigilance" or literally as "House of the Night Watch".

Modern Beit Sahour is also known as Beit Sahur an-Nasara ("Beit Sahur of the Christians"). Another, former village near Jerusalem, known as Beit Sahur al-Atiqah ("ancient Beit Sahur") or Beit Sahour al-Wadi ("Beit Sahur of the Valley"), is fully distinct from the town of Beit Sahour in the Bethlehem Governorate.

== History ==
=== Origins and early demographics ===
According to local tradition, Beit Sahour was uninhabited until the 14th century when a number of Muslim and Christian families from Wadi Musa near Petra (today in Jordan) settled in caves on the site of the modern village. Another Christian family of Wadi Musa, from the remnants of the Ghassanids, arrived in the 17th century. Further immigration in the 18th century from Rashda in Upper Egypt, Shobak in Transjordan and Al-Kukaliya in Syria cemented the Christian character of the village.

In spite of the influx of Christian families, they remained in the minority all until 1839, when Muslims from Palestine fought in the armies led by Ibrahim Pasha of Egypt in his war against the Turkish Sultan. Huge losses, due mainly to heat and dehydration rather than battle, meant that three quarters of the male Muslims of Beit Sahour perished, leaving the Christians in the majority.

=== Ottoman period ===
Beit Sahour, like the rest of Palestine, was incorporated into the Ottoman Empire in 1517, and in the census of 1525/26 (AH 932), Beit Sahur an-Nasara ('Christian Beit Sahur') had 5 Christian and 7 Muslim households, increasing in 1538/39 (AH 945) to 8 Christian and 8 Muslim households. By 1553/34 (AH 961), 13 Christian and 21 Muslim households were noted, and in 1562/63 (AH 970), 9 Christian and 17 Muslim households were counted. In 1596, Beit Sahur an-Nasara was registered as a village in the nahiyah of Quds (Jerusalem) of the Liwa of Quds, with a total population of 24 households; 15 Muslim and 9 Christian. The villages paid taxes on the same products as the villagers of Beit Sahur al-Atiqah.

The Franciscans ceased holding religious services at the shrine by Shepherd's Field around 1820. In 1864 a new Roman Catholic church and school were completed.

An Ottoman village list from about 1870 showed that Beit Sahour el-foka ("upper Beit Sahour") had a population of 37 "Latins" (Catholics) in 11 houses, and 187 "Greeks" (Eastern Orthodox) in 48 houses, bringing the total population of both villages, Beit Sahour el-foka and Beit Sahour et-tahta ("lower Beit Sahour"), to 190 (men only) in 76 houses.

In 1883, the PEF's Survey of Western Palestine (SWP) described Beit Sahur as:

This village is a sort of suburb of Bethlehem, situated on the same ridge, with the broad plateau east of it known as the 'Shepherd's Field' ... [with] the small Greek Church of the Grotto of the Shephard, a subterranean chapel reached by 20 steps, containing pictures and mosaic. Above the vault are ruins with a Latin altar. Bait Sahur contains a well-built modern house belonging to the Latin curé, and is surrounded with olives and vines.

In 1896 the population of Beit Sahour was estimated to be about 861 persons. A construction text, dating to 1897, engraved in the lintel of a door on Municipality Street has been examined, and was found to be a poem in 19th century Christian naskhi script.

=== British Mandate ===
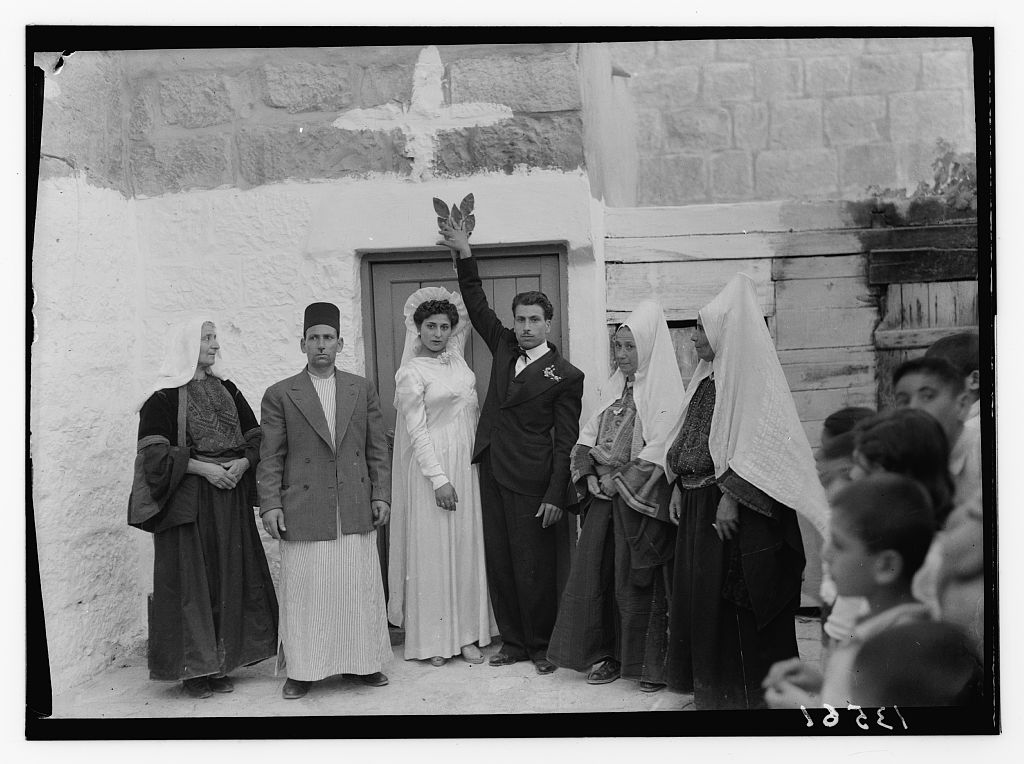
Palestinian Christian wedding, Beit Sahour, 1940

In the 1922 census of Palestine conducted by the British Mandate authorities, Bait Sahur had a population 1,519; 285 Muslims and 1,234 Christians, increasing in the 1931 census to 1,942; 395 Muslims and 1,547 Christians, in a total of 454 houses.

In the 1945 statistics the population of Beit Sahour was 2,770; 370 Muslims and 2,400 Christians, who owned 6,946 (rural) and 138 (urban) dunams of land, according to an official land and population survey. 1,031 dunams were plantations and irrigable land, 3,641 for cereals, while 100 dunams were built-up (urban) land.

=== Jordanian annexation ===
In the wake of the 1948 Arab–Israeli War and after the 1949 Armistice Agreements, Beit Sahur was annexed by Jordan along with the rest of the West Bank.

In 1961, the population of Beit Sahur was 5,316.

=== Israeli occupation ===
Since the Six-Day War in 1967, Beit Sahour has been under Israeli occupation. The population in the 1967 census was 5,380.

According to ARIJ, 52.8% of the village land is classified as being in Area A, while the remaining 47.2% is in Area C. From 1997 and onwards, Israel has confiscated hundred of dunams of village land for the construction of the Israeli settlement of Har Homa. 'Ush Ghurab, a hill occupied by a military base until 2006, became the site of a development project. A restaurant, a climbing tower, a football field and a park were built on the hillside. The municipality of Beit Sahour also had plans for a hospital and a sports center. The mainly Christian Palestinian inhabitants are being pressured by encroaching Israeli settlements, with one housing development being ruled as illegal by an Israeli court in the early 2000s and, as of 2013, standing under threat of demolition.

== Economy ==
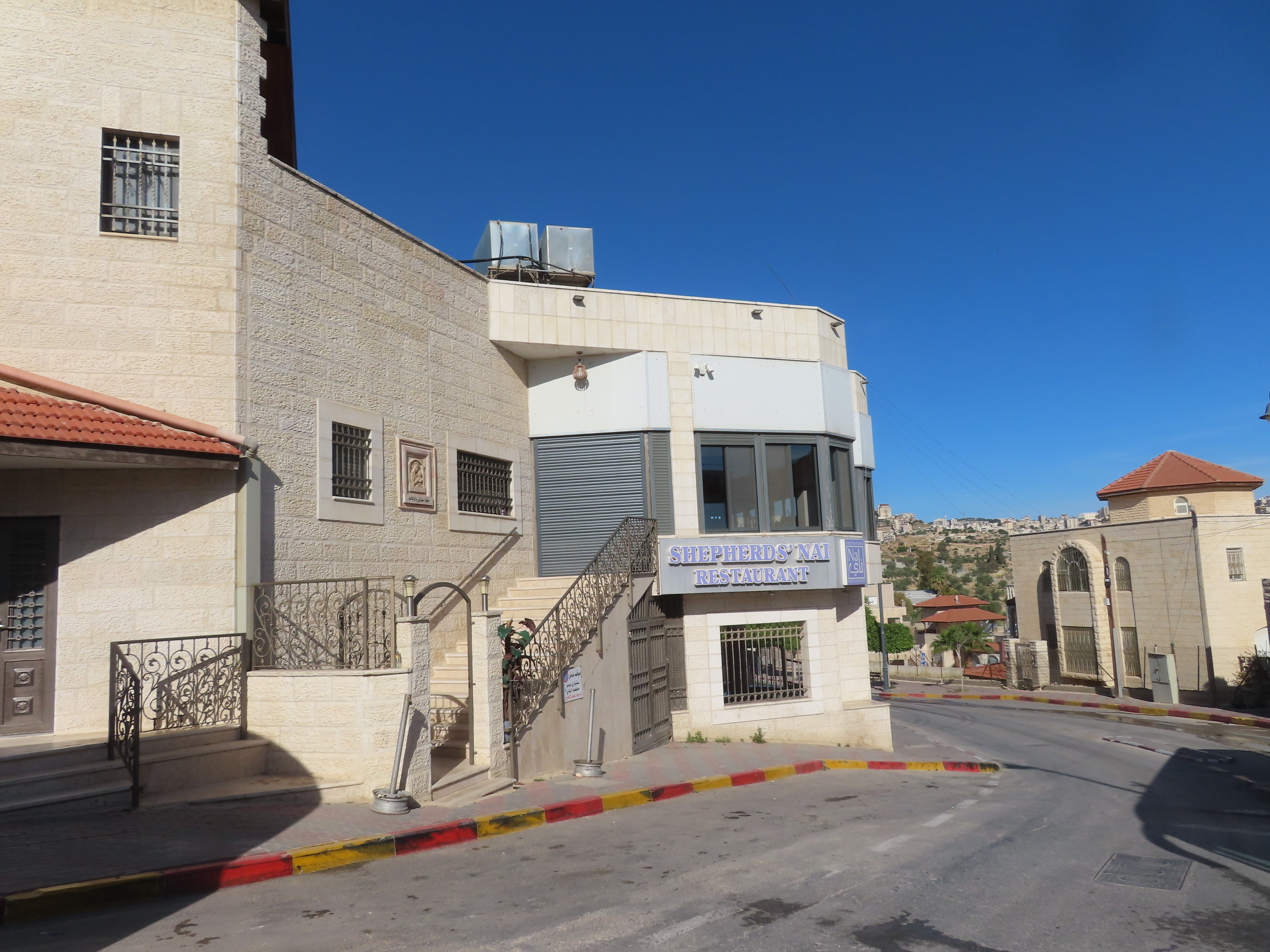
Shepherds Nai restaurant in Beit Sahour

The town's economy is largely based on tourism and related industries, such as the manufacture of olive-wood carvings. Agriculture and work in Israel also play a significant role. The town had a prominent role in the Palestinian national "Bethlehem 2000" project, as extensive renovations of tourist sites, hotels and businesses, and historic sites were carried out prior to the millennium celebrations.

During the First Intifada, residents in the town had attempted to develop their own dairy industry—a move resisted by Israeli authorities. These efforts were documented in 2014 film The Wanted 18, co-directed by Palestinian filmmaker Amer Shomali and Canadian Paul Cowan.

Social and economic development were disrupted by the Second Intifada.

== Political activism ==
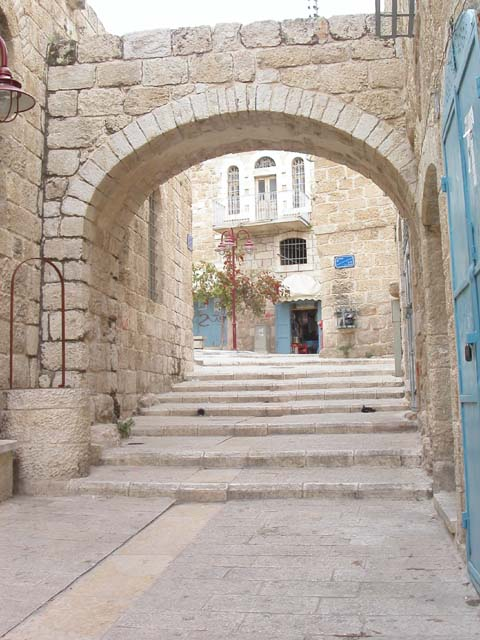
Lane in Beit Sahour

Beit Sahour is a center of Palestinian political activism. The town played a key role in the First and Second Intifadas, with local activists pioneering nonviolent resistance techniques. During the First Intifada and the Second Intifada, the Palestinian Center for Rapprochement between Peoples (PCR) based in Beit Sahour encouraged non-violent activism under the aegis of the International Solidarity Movement. George Rishmawi is director of PCR. During the First Intifada, the Palestinian Center for Rapprochement between Peoples issued an invitation to Israelis of goodwill to come and spend a weekend (Shabbat) in Palestinian homes using the slogan "Break Bread, Not Bones".

The Alternative Information Center is also partly based in the town. Elias Rishmawi, a member of the Beit Sahour council, is co-founder, together with Ghassan Andoni, Majed Nassar, Rifat Odeh Kassis and Jamal Salameh, of the Alternative Tourism Group (ATG), a non-governmental organisation specializing in tours of the Palestinian territories, where the olive harvest is used as a backdrop for showing the effects of the Israeli occupation and land confiscation on the Palestinian population.

=== Tax resistance ===
In 1989, during the First Intifada, the Palestinian resistance (Unified National Leadership of the Uprising, UNLU) and Ghassan Andoni and Kamel Danoun, urged people to stop paying taxes to Israel, which inherited and modified the previous Jordanian tax-collection regime in the West Bank. "No taxation without representation," said a statement from the organizers. "The military authorities do not represent us, and we did not invite them to come to our land. Must we pay for the bullets that kill our children or for the expenses of the occupying army?" The people of Beit Sahour responded to this call with an organized citywide tax strike that included refusal to pay and file tax returns.

Israeli defense minister Yitzhak Rabin responded: "We will teach them there is a price for refusing the laws of Israel." The Israeli military authorities placed the town under curfew for 42 days, blocked food shipments into the town, cut telephone lines to the town, tried to bar reporters from the town, imprisoned ten residents (among them Fuad Kokaly and Rifat Odeh Kassis) and seized in house-to-house raids millions of dollars in money and property belonging to 350 families. The Israeli military stopped the consuls-general of Belgium, Britain, France, Greece, Italy, Spain and Sweden when they attempted to go to Beit Sahour and investigate the conditions there during the tax strike.

Israel's military occupation had the authority to create and enforce taxes beyond the baseline Jordanian code enacted in 1963 in areas formerly administered by that country, including Beit Sahour. During the Intifada, they used that authority to impose taxes on Palestinians as collective punishment measures to discourage the Intifada, for instance "the glass tax (for broken windows), the stones tax (for damage done by stones), the missile tax (for Gulf War damage), and a general intifada tax, among others."

The United Nations Security Council considered a resolution demanding that Israel return the property it confiscated during the Beit Sahour tax resistance. The United States vetoed the resolution, which was supported by the other eleven council members.

== Municipal government ==
The municipal council of Beit Sahour was established by the British Mandate on April 16, 1926, but was formally implemented in 1929. Prior to that date, the first village council was established in 1925 at the initiative of the citizens of Beit Sahour. The village council developed into a municipal council in 1955 under the chairmanship of Nicola Abu Eita.

In the 2005 municipal election, two lists gained seats in the municipal council. Eight seats went to 'United Beit Sahour' and five to 'Sons of Beit Sahour'. The most popular vote was for Hani Naji Atallah Abdel Masieh of United Beit Sahour with 2,690 votes, followed by Elen Michael Saliba Qsais of Sons of Bethlehem with 2,280 votes.

== Demography ==
According to the 1984 census, there were 8,900 Beit Sahouris. 67% were Greek Orthodox, 17% were Sunni Muslim, 8% were Latin Catholic, 6% were Greek Catholic and 2% were Lutheran.

== "Shepherds' Field" pilgrimage churches ==
The old core of Beit Sahour is reputed to be close to the place where, according to the New Testament, an angel announced the birth of Jesus to the shepherds—the "Annunciation to the shepherds". The eastern part of Beit Sahour is home to two sites alleged to be the biblical "Shepherds' Field".

=== Greek Orthodox monastery ===
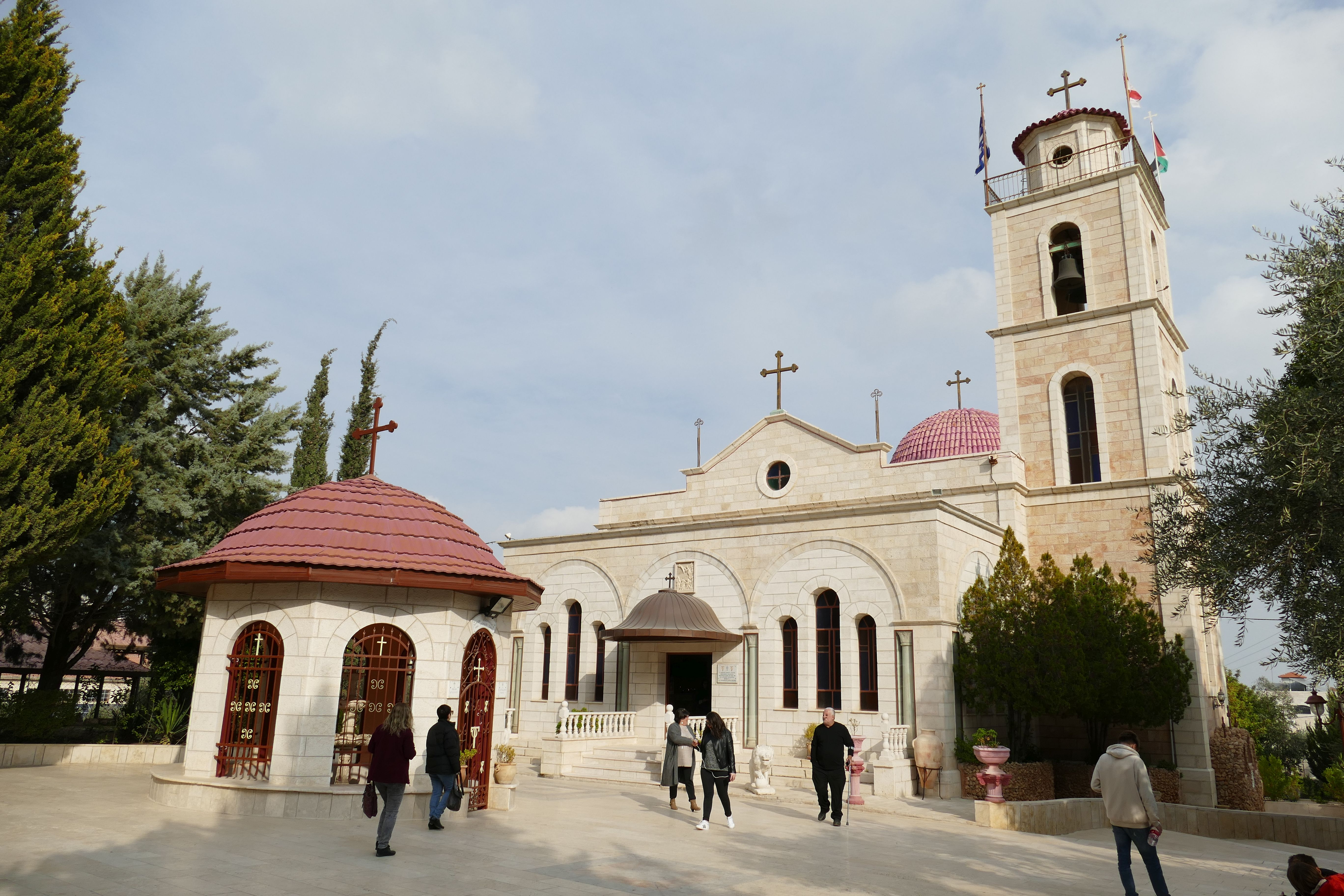
Shepherds' Fields, the new Greek Orthodox church

Kenisat er-Ruwat is the name of the site where, according to tradition, St. Helena built a convent, which is today known as the shepherd's cave. The Franciscans acquired a shrine there in 1347.

The Status Quo, a 250-year old understanding between religious communities, applies in principle to the site, although no concrete regulations could be found.

The new Greek Orthodox monastery, which includes on its grounds the ancient church, was established through the efforts of Archimandrite Serapheim Savvaitis as a metochion of the Lavra of St. Sabbas between 1971 and 1989.

=== Catholic monastery ===
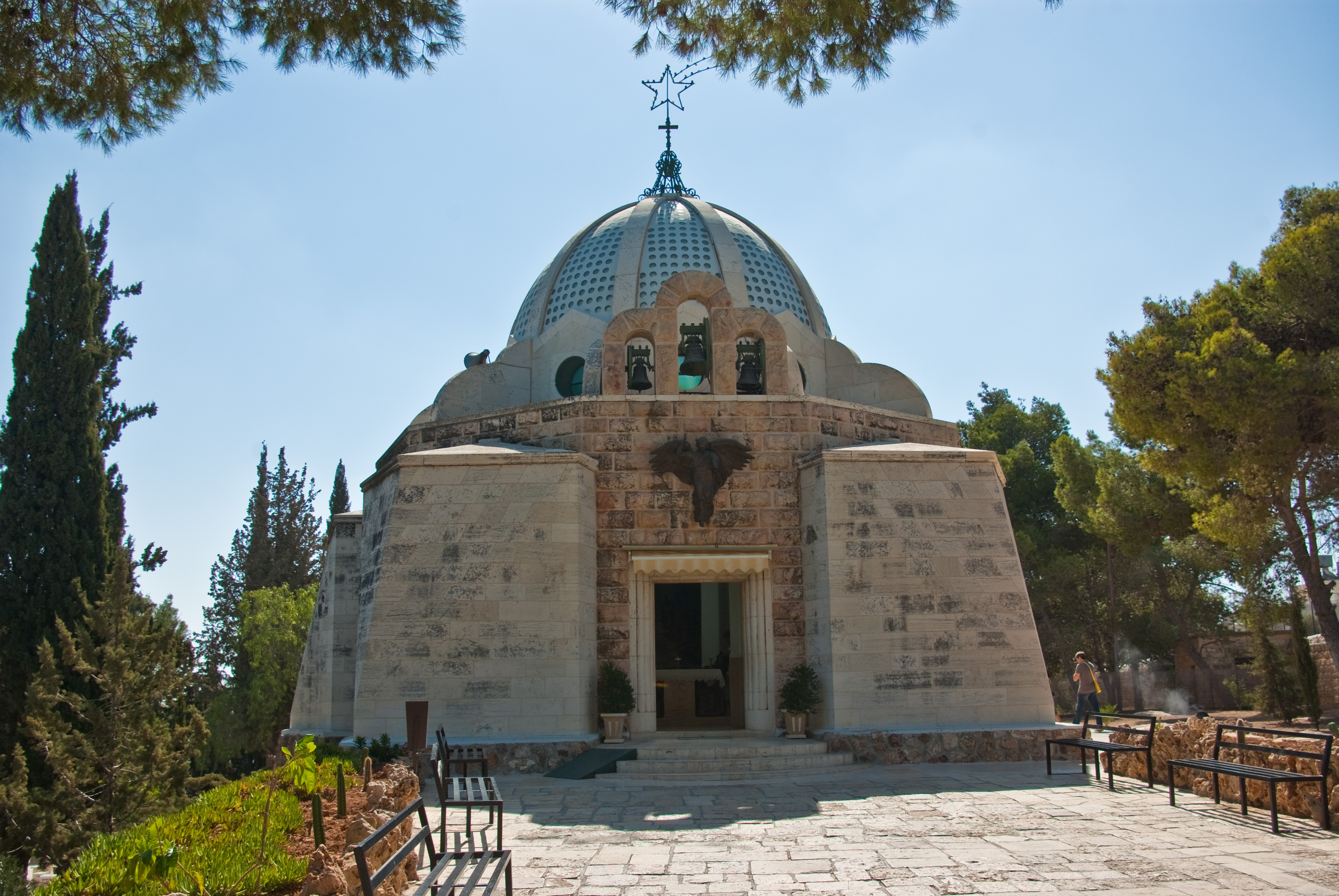
Catholic Shepherds' Field Chapel

The Catholic site belongs to the Franciscan Custody of the Holy Land and includes the Chapel of the Shepherds' Field, along with two cave chapels and the ruins of a Byzantine monastery known in Arabic as Khirbet Siyar el-Ghanem ("Ruins of the Sheepfold").

== Archaeology ==
=== Khirbet Umm-Toba ===
Within the environs of Beit Sahour is the ruin Khirbet Umm Toba. An archaeological survey-excavation was conducted at the site in 2010, 2013 and 2016 by Zubair Adawi on behalf of the Israel Antiquities Authority (IAA), which yielded pottery from the Byzantine era. Some had surmised that the site may have been the Caphartobas of Josephus.

=== Khirbet Beit Bassa ===
In the southern outskirts of the village is the ruin Khirbet Beit Bassa, which is identified with Bethbassi, a fortress in the toparchy of Herodium in which Hasmonean leader Jonathan Appus was besieged by Seleucid general Bacchides.

== International relations ==
=== Twin towns and sister cities ===
Beit Sahour is twinned with many cities and communes across the world.

City	Country	Date
Al Manama	Bahrain	1990
Fiorenzuola d'Arda	Italy	1990
Roman	France	1995
Korydallos	Greece	2000
Opsterland	Netherlands	2000
Concon	Chile	2001
Laconi	Italy	2001
Province of Piacenza	Italy	2003
Rimini	Italy	2003
Quatrro-Castella	Italy	2005
Vaulx-en-Velin	France	2006
Fuheis	Jordan	2008
Mira	Italy	2008
Anghiari	Italy	2009
Clichy	France	2009
Doha	Qatar	2009
San Fernando	Chile	2009
Xanten	Germany	2011
Alba Iulia	Romania	2015
Utena	Lithuania	2015
Tralee	Ireland	2019

== Notable people ==
- Ghassan Andoni (b. 1956), physics professor and non-violent resistance activist
- Laila al-Atrash (1948–2021), writer and journalist
- Israa Ghrayeb, 2019 "honour killing" victim
- Munther Isaac (b. 1979), pastor, author, and theologian
- Rifat Odeh Kassis, human rights and community activist active since the 1990s
- Fuad Kokaly (b. 1962), former mayor, politician and diplomat
- Qustandi Shomali (b. 1946), professor of history
- Mazin B. Qumsiyeh (b. 1957), scientist, national and human rights activist

== Beit Sahur al-Atiqah near Jerusalem ==
Beit Saḥur al-Atiqah ('ancient Beit Sahur') or Beit Sahour al-Wadi ('Beit Sahur of the valley'), Palestine grid 171/123, is geographically distinct from Beit Sahour and lies very close to the Old City of Jerusalem, upon a lofty hill across the valley of Kidron, not far from En-Rogel. It surrounded the tomb of Sheikh Ahmad al-Sahuri, a local saint to whom the local Arab tribe of al-Sawahreh Mujir al-Din mentions this place in a biography of a Muslim scholar Sha'ban bin Salim bin Sha'ban, who died in Beit Sahur al-Atiqah in 1483 at the age of 105.

In 1596, Beit Sahour al-Wadi appeared in Ottoman tax registers as a village in the nahiyah of Quds of the Liwa of Quds. Beit Sahour al-Wadi had a population of 40 Muslim households. The villagers paid taxes on wheat, barley, vines or fruit trees, and goats or beehives; a total of 4,500 akçe. All of the revenue went to waqfs; half of which was to the madrasah Muzhiriyya in Jerusalem.

The place was noted by French geographer Guerin in 1863 as being 40 minutes south-east of Jerusalem, a short distance south of the Kidron Valley.

An Ottoman village list from about 1870 showed that Beit Sahour et-Tahta ("the lower Beit Sahour") [mislabelled?] had a population of 66 (whereby only men were counted), with a total of 17 houses.

In 1883, the PEF's Survey of Western Palestine (SWP) described the place as: "Ruins of a village with wells and a mukam." Clermont-Ganneau found here several old tombs in the 1890s.

== See also ==
- Herodium, nearby major archaeological site
- Palestinian Christians
- Palestinian diaspora

== Bibliography ==
- Abel, F.M. (1938). Geographie de la Palestine. Vol. 2, Geographie Politique. Les villes. Librairie Lecoffre.
- Barron, J.B., ed. (1923). Palestine: Report and General Abstracts of the Census of 1922. Government of Palestine.
- Burgoyne, Michael Hamilton (1987). Mamluk Jerusalem. British School of Archaeology in Jerusalem by the World of Islam Festival Trust. ISBN 090503533X.
- Clermont-Ganneau, C.S. (1899). [ARP] Archaeological Researches in Palestine 1873-1874, translated from the French by J. McFarlane. Vol. 1. London: Palestine Exploration Fund.
- Conder, C.R.; Kitchener, H.H. (1883). The Survey of Western Palestine: Memoirs of the Topography, Orography, Hydrography, and Archaeology. Vol. 3. London: Committee of the Palestine Exploration Fund. 29; 29, 85 (Beit Sahur al-Atiqah)
- Government of Jordan, Department of Statistics (1964). First Census of Population and Housing. Volume I: Final Tables; General Characteristics of the Population (PDF).
- Government of Palestine, Department of Statistics (1945). Village Statistics, April, 1945.
- Guérin, V. (1868). Description Géographique Historique et Archéologique de la Palestine (in French). Vol. 1: Judee, pt. 1. Paris: L'Imprimerie Nationale.
- Hadawi, S. (1970). Village Statistics of 1945: A Classification of Land and Area ownership in Palestine. Palestine Liberation Organization Research Centre.
- Hartmann, M. (1883). "Die Ortschaftenliste des Liwa Jerusalem in dem türkischen Staatskalender für Syrien auf das Jahr 1288 der Flucht (1871)". Zeitschrift des Deutschen Palästina-Vereins. 6: 102–149.
- Hütteroth, W.-D.; Abdulfattah, K. (1977). Historical Geography of Palestine, Transjordan and Southern Syria in the Late 16th Century. Erlanger Geographische Arbeiten, Sonderband 5. Erlangen, Germany: Vorstand der Fränkischen Geographischen Gesellschaft. ISBN 3-920405-41-2.
- Kildani, Hanna (2010). Modern Christianity in the Holy Land. AuthorHouse. ISBN 9781449052843.
- Mills, E., ed. (1932). Census of Palestine 1931. Population of Villages, Towns and Administrative Areas. Jerusalem: Government of Palestine.
- Palmer, E.H. (1881). The Survey of Western Palestine: Arabic and English Name Lists Collected During the Survey by Lieutenants Conder and Kitchener, R. E. Transliterated and Explained by E.H. Palmer. Committee of the Palestine Exploration Fund.
- Robinson, E.; Smith, E. (1841). Biblical Researches in Palestine, Mount Sinai and Arabia Petraea: A Journal of Travels in the year 1838. Vol. 2. Boston: Crocker & Brewster. (pp. 157, 159, 171)
- Sharon, M. (1999). Corpus Inscriptionum Arabicarum Palaestinae, B-C. Vol. 2. BRILL. ISBN 90-04-11083-6.
- Schick, C. (1896). "Zur Einwohnerzahl des Bezirks Jerusalem". Zeitschrift des Deutschen Palästina-Vereins. 19: 120–127.
- Socin, A. (1879). "Alphabetisches Verzeichniss von Ortschaften des Paschalik Jerusalem". Zeitschrift des Deutschen Palästina-Vereins. 2: 135–163.
- Toledano, E. (1984). "The Sanjaq of Jerusalem in the Sixteenth Century: Aspects of Topography and Population". Archivum Ottomanicum. 9: 279–319. Archived from the original on 5 March 2016.
