= Incidents in the Gaza War (2008–2009) =

Incidents in the Gaza War include incidents involving attacks against civilians, schools, a mosque, and naval confrontations.

== United Nations facilities ==
A United Nations inquiry into attacks on UN personnel or facilities during the Gaza War concluded that Israel had fired on U.N. personnel or facilities on eight separate incidents. The Board found no evidence that U.N. facilities had been used to launch attacks against the IDF. However, the Board's findings conclude only that violation of the inviolability of U.N. premises had occurred; its report does not make legal findings and does not consider whether laws of armed conflict were breached, as acknowledged by U.N. Secretary General Ban Ki-moon.

The Israeli Government report notes that indeed the test applied by the UN Inquiry Board was merely whether the physical premises of U.N. facilities had been affected and not whether the Laws of Armed Conflict were violated. The IDF conducted its own probe into claims regarding incidents where UN and international facilities were fired upon and damaged. The findings published argue that in all the cases investigated, the damage resulted either from retaliatory fire or from misuse of the UN vehicles by Hamas militants and that there were no deliberate intentions to hit UN facilities.

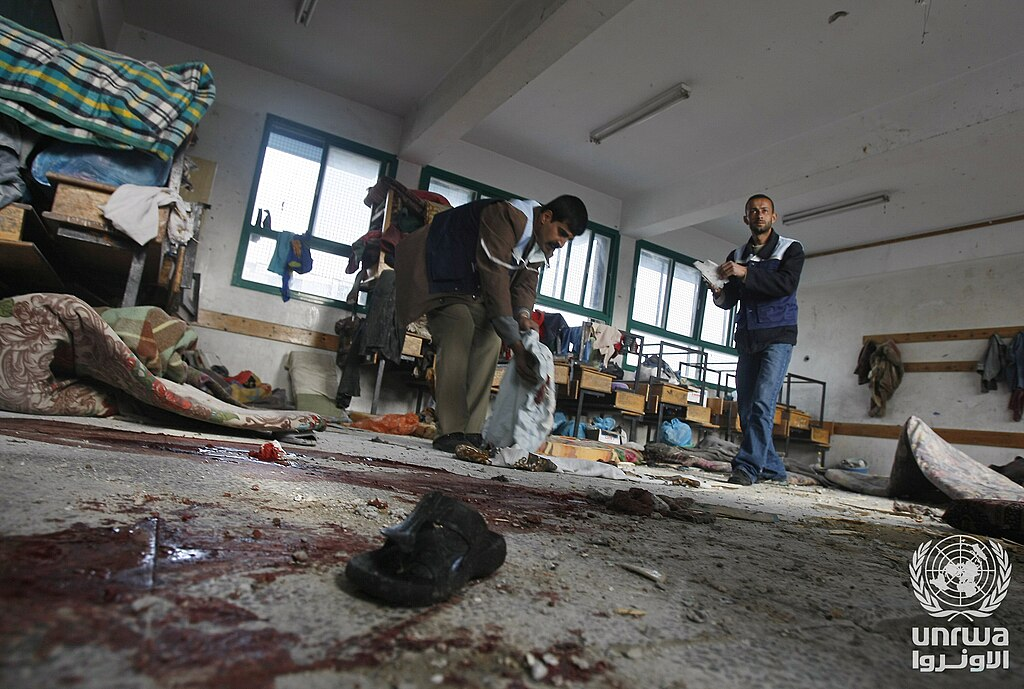
A UN school in Beit Lahiya damaged during an Israeli attack on 17 January

U.N. Secretary General Ban Ki-moon said the United Nations would consult with Israel to improve their lines of communication to prevent future attacks on U.N. personnel and facilities. Ban plans to seek compensation from Israel for the damage to U.N. property, estimated at $11 million. Mirit Cohen, an Israeli spokeswoman, said that Israeli military inquiries proved beyond doubt that the IDF did not intentionally fire at any U.N. installations. The U.N. board of inquiry urged Israel to withdraw charges that Palestinians had fired from inside U.N.-run schools and U.N. relief offices. Israeli officials said they had already done so in their military inquiry.

=== Al-Fakhura school attack, 6 January 2009 ===
Al-Fakhura school attack, was an incident in which it was initially reported that Israeli forces had shelled a UNRWA school on January 6, 2009, and killed upwards of 30 people. At the time, the incident drew widespread condemnation from around the world. Reports from The Globe and Mail as well as Haaretz concluded that no one was killed inside the school in contradiction to a report from a separate branch of the UN. UNRWA responded that it had maintained from the day of attack "that the shelling and all of the fatalities took place outside and not inside the school."

=== UNRWA Asma Elementary School, 5 January 2009 ===
Following the investigation into the incident, the U.N. Board concluded that Israel intentionally struck a U.N.-run school, exhibiting a "reckless disregard for the lives and safety" of civilians; three civilians were killed. The Israeli Government report claims that the UN Inquiry acknowledged that "information regarding the School functioning as a shelter for civilians was provided by the U.N. to IDF only on 6 January 2009, the day after the incident had occurred. A list of facilities serving as shelters — provided by the U.N. one day earlier on 4 January 2009 — did not include UNRWA Asma School". However, earlier that day, UNRWA apparently had opened the school as an emergency shelter, after it had been closed for nine days prior the incident. IDF's investigation of the incident revealed that on the night of 5 January, a unit of militants was present in Asma School site. Supposedly without being aware that civilians were present in the site, the IDF targeted the unit.

=== UNRWA Field Office Compound, 15 January 2009 ===
On January 15, the IDF shelled a storage facility within the compound of the UN headquarters for Gaza, containing tons of food and sheltering hundreds of Palestinian refugees. According to United Nations personnel, unexploded ordnance analysis demonstrates that the compound was hit with 155m white phosphorus ammunition. The facility did not have the equipment to extinguish the chemical fire and it spread towards several fuel tanks. The UN asked the IDF for a local ceasefire in order to try to put out the fires, but the request was denied. UN Secretary-General Ban Ki-Moon expressed "strong protest and outrage". An Israeli Defence Spokesperson was quoted as saying "We regret that such an incident occurred, I am sorry for it however Hamas fired rockets and troops received fire coming from within the site." The United Nations has dismissed the Israeli explanation as "total nonsense". A senior UN official who was inside the building when it was attacked also denounced the Israeli statements as false and said that there were only non combatants in the building. The report from Israeli Government quotes findings of the UN Board Inquiry into the incident: the Board "was not within its scope to assess general allegations or denials" regarding "possible military activity close to United Nations premises and possible military use of nearby buildings". The Israeli position on this incident is that the incident "took place during intense fighting, which involved Hamas’ deployment of anti-tank units equipped with advanced anti-tank missiles north of the UNRWA compound", which posed threat to IDF forces in the area. IDF implemented an effective smokescreen as a protective measure in response, anticipating only "limited risk to civilians in relation to this operational advantage".

== Civilians and civilian infrastructure ==
The IDF said civilian buildings in the Gaza Strip were destroyed during Operation Cast Lead due to "substantial operational needs" citing examples of buildings being booby-trapped, located over tunnels, or used by combatants to fire from.

=== Civilians ===
==== In Israel ====
During the conflict, life in much of southern Israel was paralyzed by Hamas rocket and mortar fire. According to HRW, during the Gaza War, rocket attacks placed up to 800,000 Israeli civilians within range of attack.

During the war, rockets reached major Israeli cities Ashdod, Beersheba and Gedera for the first time, putting one-eighth of Israel's population in rocket range. As of January 13, 2009, Palestinian militants had launched approximately 565 rockets and 200 mortars at Israel since the beginning of the conflict, according to Israeli security sources.

Besides the rockets fired by the Qassam Brigades of Hamas, other factions claimed responsibility for rockets fired into Israel and attacks on Israeli soldiers, including Al-Aqsa Martyrs' Brigades (affiliated with Fatah), the Abu Ali Mustapha Brigades (armed wing of the Popular Front for the Liberation of Palestine), the Quds Brigades and the Popular Resistance Councils. A Fatah official stated that the rocket attacks by his faction contradicted the official position of Mahmoud Abbas, Fatah leader and President of the Palestinian National Authority. Abbas had called on all sides to cease hostilities unconditionally.

Militants fired over 750 rockets and mortars from Gaza into Israel during the conflict. Bersheeba and Gedera were the furthest areas hit by rocket or mortars. The rockets killed three civilians and one IDF soldier and wounded 182 people, with another 584 people suffering from shock and anxiety syndrome. The rockets also caused property damage, including damage to three schools. Senior Hamas official Mahmoud al-Zahar stated during the operation "they [Israeli forces] shelled everyone in Gaza.... They shelled children and hospitals and mosques, ... and in doing so, they gave us legitimacy to strike them in the same way." Human Rights Watch noted in the open letter to Ismail Haniyeh that despite his Foreign Ministry stance as part of response to the Goldstone Report, Palestinian armed groups remain responsible for firing rockets indiscriminately or deliberately at Israeli civilian objects. HRW also noted that Palestinian militants put Palestinian civilians at risk of Israeli counter-attacks by launching rockets from populated areas.

==== In the Gaza Strip ====
BBC News stated on January 14 that the agency and the Israeli human rights group B'tselem have received claims from Gaza civilians that IDF forces fired on Gaza residents trying to escape the area. Israel has strongly denied the allegations, and dismissed B'tselem's report as "without foundation". The BBC reported speaking to members of a family who say they were shot at as they tried to leave to replenish dwindling water and food supplies during the three-hour humanitarian lull. It also mentioned allegations of the targeted killing of women, the elderly, and children trying to flee the conflict. B'tselem has been unable to corroborate the testimonies it had received.

On January 16, Dr. Ezzeldeen Abu al-Aish, an Israeli-trained Palestinian doctor of Gaza, and regular figure on Israel's Channel 10 where he reported on the medical crisis, broke down when contacted for his nightly report by informing viewers that he had just lost three daughters and a niece in the fighting, prompting numerous calls of concern to the station from people who know him. Two surviving daughters were transported for treatment of their wounds to Tel Ha-Shomer Hospital in Tel Aviv. The Israeli army's investigation, approved by Chief of Staff Gabi Ashkenazi, stated that an IDF tank fired two shells at the house after suspicious figures were seen on the upper level of the doctor's home. The doctor has questioned part of the IDF report, saying his home is located in "Jebaliya, northeast of Gaza City, not in the Gaza City neighborhood of Sajaiyeh; there was no firing from his house; and he saw no pamphlets with Israeli warnings to evacuate that the military said it dropped." The Israeli army "could not be reached for an explanation (of the) discrepancies from their written statement." The British Army veteran Colonel Tim Collins visited the site of the incident. He said that from the spot the tank fired, no clear-cut target was visible. He added that the shot was questionable, but at the same time he understands how Israeli troops, situated at the inferior position, could have felt threatened in the middle of the battle.

The use of Palestinian children as human shields by Israeli forces during the conflict has been reported.

=== Israeli schools ===
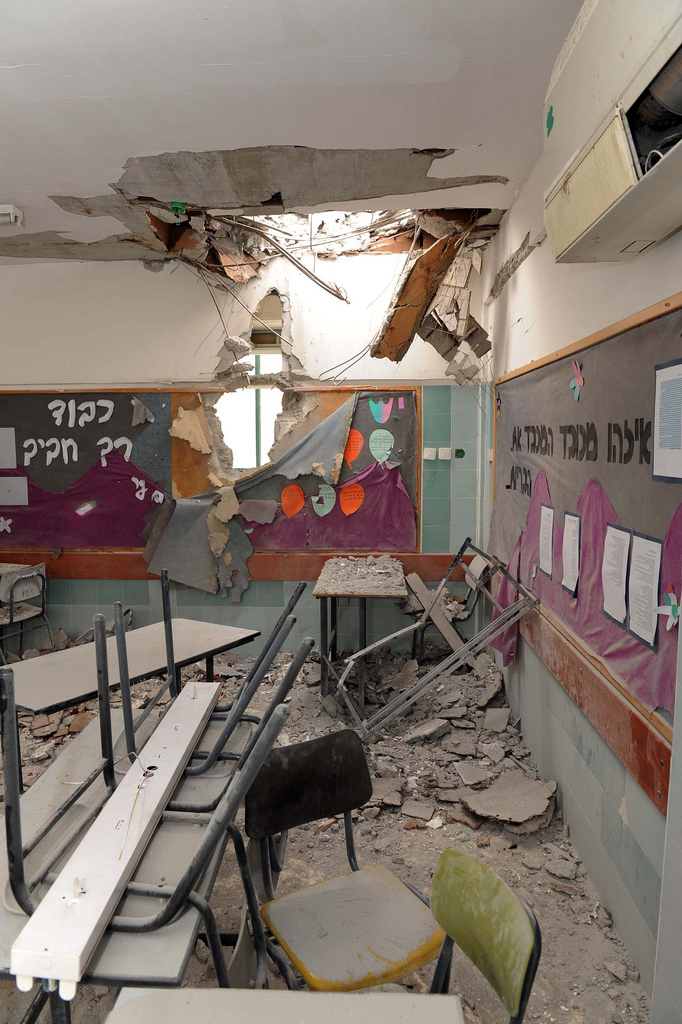
Kindergarten classroom in Beersheba hit by Grad rocket from Gaza

Palestinian rockets landed on Israeli educational facilities several times during the conflict.

During the war, a Hamas rocket hit an Israeli kindergarten in Beersheba, causing damage to the building and to a nearby house. Dozens of people were treated for shock. In another case, a rocket landed in an Israeli elementary school in Beersheba, causing severe damage was caused to the structure. Hamas claimed responsibility for the attack. A Qassam rocket hit another school in Ashkelon, destroying classrooms and injuring two people.

Studies officially resumed on January 11. Only schools with fortified classrooms and bomb shelters were allowed to bring students in, and IDF Home Front Command representatives were stationed in the schools; attendance was low.

=== Medical facilities and personnel ===
The largest hospital on Israel's southern coast, Ashkelon's Barzilai Hospital, moved its critical treatment facilities into an underground shelter after a Gaza-fired rocket struck beside its helicopter pad on December 28.

On January 4, 2009, Israeli planes hit the A-Raeiya Medical Center and its mobile clinics, without warning, causing damages of $800,000. The center, which served 100 patients a day, was clearly marked as a medical facility and was located in the middle of a residential area, with no government or military facilities are nearby.

Several testimonies from local Gazan population and from IDF soldiers stated that Hamas operatives donned medic uniforms and commandeered ambulances for fighters transportation. After the Israeli airstrike on the central prison which resulted in prisoners being released into the streets, several of the 115 prisoners accused of collaboration with Israel who had not yet been tried, were executed by Hamas militants in civilian clothes in the Shifa hospital compound. An IDF probe released on April 22, 2009, stated that an incident involving a UN vehicle attacked by the IDF occurred after the IDF identified a Palestinian anti-tank squad disembarking from the vehicle. The Palestinian Authority's Health Ministry accused the Hamas-run government's security services of using several hospitals and clinics in Gaza as interrogation and detention centers, where medical staffers have been expelled, during and after the war. The IDF probe made similar charges and stated that Hamas operated a command and control center inside Shifa Hospital in the Gaza City throughout the War.

On January 11, Israeli forces "completely destroyed" a clinic run by Catholic relief group Caritas in al-Meghazi, also damaging 20 nearby homes in the attack.

The following day, a mother and infant clinic run by Christian Aid and the Near East Council of Churches was destroyed by Israeli jets, Patients and workers were given only fifteen minutes to evacuate, before the bombing. Archbishop Barry Morgan demanded an explanation from the Israeli Ambassador to London regarding this attack on the Shij'ia Family Health Care Centre which served 10,836 families, solely dependent on the center for medical support. According to the report of the Israeli Government published in July 2009, the operational goal of the strike was to destroy a Hamas storage site located in the same building. The report adds that "there was no sign indicating the presence of the clinic, and its location had not been reported or otherwise known to the IDF prior to the military operation against the weapons depot".

The Aal Quds Hospital, in the densely populated Tal Hawa residential district, was hit by Israeli shell-fire on January 16. The International Federation of Red Cross and Red Crescent Societies called the attack on the hospital "completely and utterly unacceptable based on every known standard of international humanitarian law". An official in the Palestinian People's Party said that resistance fighters were firing from positions all around the hospital. Corriere della Sera reporter wrote that the grounds, ambulances and uniforms of the al-Quds hospital had been hijacked by Hamas operatives. On January 15, the IDF fired at a Red Crescent hospital holding 400–500 people at the Tel Hawwa neighborhood of Gaza City. As claimed by Palestinian Authority's Health Ministry in Ramallah, both clinics were used by Hamas militants as interrogation and detention centers.

Israeli forces also attacked and damaged Danish mobile health clinics, prompting the Danish Foreign Ministry to consider demanding compensation from Israel. Muhammad Ramadan of the ICRC testified to Physicians for Human Rights-Israel (PHP-I) that his ambulance, clearly marked with ICRC symbols was shot at by a tank despite coordination with the IDF. Medics with the Palestine Red Crescent also claimed to have been deliberately fired upon by Israeli forces. On January 11, a senior IDF officer accused Hamas gunmen of using Red Crescent ambulances to break the IDF battle line into northern Gaza from the south. On January 12, a Palestinian doctor was killed by an Israeli helicopter while attempting to evacuate the wounded from a building hit by missiles in the Jabaliya refugee camp.

The Israel-based Intelligence and Terrorism Information Center claims that, around the start of the conflict, the Hamas police force operations room in the northern Gaza moved into the Kamal Adwan hospital. On December 31, 2008, Israel Security Agency head Yuval Diskin told the government cabinet that he believed that Hamas militants have taken shelter in various Gaza hospitals. On January 11, a senior IDF officer accused Hamas gunmen of hiding inside Red Crescent ambulances in order to break the IDF battle line separating northern and southern Gaza.

On January 12, Israeli Public Security Minister accused Hamas militants of hiding in Gaza's Shifa Hospital, using the rooms to "hold meetings," and donning medics' uniforms. UNRWA disputes the assertions, and Shifa Hospital's Director accused the Israeli minister of lying in order to advance his political career, though the hospital doesn't monitor who enters or exits the building. On January 13, the PBS program "Wide Angle" reported that an anonymous doctor at Shifa stated that Hamas officials were hiding underneath the hospital building, "putting civilians in harm's way". On January 14, Israel Ambassador to the United Nations Gabriela Shalev filed a formal complaint to the UN Secretary General, claiming the discovery of a war room under Shifa Hospital, that Hamas used patients as human shields.

It has, additionally, been reported that ambulance drivers tending to the wounded were targeted and in some cases killed by Israeli forces, despite having been wearing outfits clearly identifying them as medical personnel.

Five supposed collaborators with Israel were killed at the compound of Shifa hospital by Hamas militants dressed in civilian clothes. Several reports in mass media suggest that Hamas fighters used the ambulances to transport combatants.

Palestinian Authority's Health Ministry in Ramallah also accused Hamas of using hospitals and clinics in Gaza as interrogation and detention centers: "Hospitals ... that were taken over include Al-Quds Hospital in Tal Al-Hawa, a Red Crescent initiative, parts of the Ash-Shifa Hospital in Gaza City, the upper and lower floors of the An-Nasser Hospital, as well as the Psychiatric Hospital".

=== Zeitoun killings ===
According to witnesses reports, on January 5, Israeli troops ordered about 110 Palestinians, mostly women and children (separately detaining the men), into a single building without running water or food in the Zeitoun district, only to shell the building 24 hours later. The IDF stated that it had no knowledge of such attack, and argued that the claim is unreasonable since it claimed to have no forces present in that area on January 4. Israeli television claimed that Gaza hospitals had no knowledge of the attack.

Initial reports suggested that anywhere between 11 (including 5 infants) and 70 were killed. Later reports stated that 30 people died in the attack. The United Nations confirmed the witnesses' testimonies in a report published on January 9. The report, by the U.N. Office for the Coordination of Humanitarian Affairs said the attack was "one of the gravest" in the conflict, and called an investigation into the attack. The report offered no evidence that the attack was deliberate, and Allegro Pacheco, a senior U.N. official in Jerusalem who helped draft the report on the attack for OCHA, added: "We are not making an accusation of deliberate action" by the Israelis.

According to an eyewitness account, while rounding up the Palestinians, Israeli soldiers shot dead two civilians, including a child.

According to the Red Cross, ambulances were not given permission to enter the neighborhood to retrieve the injured from the building that day, but did so a day later. Three children had later died after they were transported to hospital. After the attack, ambulances found four children clinging to their mothers' corpses for 48 hours, though Israeli soldiers were stationed nearby and did nothing to help. United Nations High Commissioner for Human Rights, Navanethem Pillay, said "Incidents such as this must be investigated because they display elements of what could constitute war crimes.", and called for "credible, independent and transparent" investigations into possible violations of humanitarian law.

Reports of the attack were given to the media by a Mads Gilbert, a Norwegian doctor and political activist stationed in the Shifa Hospital, Gaza, on January 5, and several newspapers reported that the survivors of the attack were treated at Shifa hospital.

As the 13th of January, the bodies of those killed in the attacks on 5 January has still not been recovered, despite the appeals to the Israeli army for access to the Al Samouni home.

Researcher of the Jerusalem Center for Public Affairs, colonel (res.) Halevi claims that an examination of freely accessible Palestinian sources show that at least three members of the al-Samouni family were affiliated with Palestinian Islamic Jihad group; Tawfiq al-Samouni, who was killed on January 5, was supposedly a Palestinian Islamic Jihad operative. Moreover, he suggests that the official Palestinian Islamic Jihad version of the occurrences on the day of the incident indicate that its fighters had been operating in the area against IDF. Based on the evidences, he suggests that it is plausible civilians were caught in the fighting.

=== Ibrahim al-Maqadna mosque ===
On January 3, 2009, the Israeli Defense Force attacked the Ibrahim al-Maqadna mosque in Beit Lahiya at dusk. Witnesses said over 200 Palestinians were praying inside at the time. Thirteen people, including six children, were killed, and 30 people were reported wounded.

Israel has accused Hamas of using mosques to hide weapons and ammunition. The IDF's Spokesperson Unit has published videos showing secondary explosions that occurred after destroying mosques, alleging that these were caused by the weapons and ammunition hidden in them.

=== Abd Rabbo family incident ===
On January 7, 2009, Israeli soldiers allegedly shot at members of the Abd Rabbo family who were trying to leave the house. The incident was detailed by several news agencies, human-rights organizations and the Goldstone report.

== International civilian efforts to break the blockade on Gaza ==
=== The Arion ===
The Arion merchant vessel, which was headed to Gaza under a Greek Merchant Ensign in order to offer humanitarian aid as part of the Free Gaza movement, returned to Larnaca, Cyprus on January 15. According to the captain, the ship returned to Larnaca after an encounter with Israeli warships at a distance of 92 nautical miles from the Cape Greco off Cyprus in Famagusta Bay, which is in international waters. Three Israeli ships approached the Arion and warned it that if it will not change its course towards Gaza, and sail into Israeli waters, they will be forced to attack it. Aboard the Arion there were twelve Greek nationals and activists aboard as well as journalists and doctors of other nationalities.

Greece had informed the Israeli government on its transfer of humanitarian aid days ago, but also warned the leaders of the expedition about the dangers of the expedition.

The Greek government informed the head of the initiative and all those participating fully and in a timely manner – before the vessel set off – pointing out to them the serious safety risks involved in their planned action, which entails passing through a closed military sea zone that has been designated by Israel in the crisis region.

At the same time, we have carried out and are carrying out all of the necessary diplomatic actions towards the Israeli side, underscoring the purely humanitarian nature of this effort and calling on the Israeli authorities to handle the situation with the requisite sensitivity and with particular caution so as not to jeopardize the safety of those who are on board the vessel Arion."

=== The Dignity ===
On December 29, 2008, the Free Gaza Movement sailboat Dignity set sail from Cyprus, headed for Gaza, attempting to deliver 3.5 tonnes (3.9 short tons) of medical supplies to its residents. The boat, which was boarded by Caoimhe Butterly, Cynthia McKinney, journalists from Al Jazeera and CNN, three surgeons including Dr. Elena Theoharous, was forced to turn back after a confrontation with Israeli naval vessels. According to passengers and crew, their boat was approached after dark, in international waters 90 miles off the coast of Gaza, ordered to halt, and upon refusal fired upon and rammed, thus sustaining heavy damage. Israel responded that no shooting had occurred, the sailboat was inside Israeli territorial waters, that it had failed to respond to Israeli naval radio contact, crashed into an Israeli vessel and refused Israeli assistance. Not having enough fuel to return to Cyprus, the boat docked in Lebanon.

Cyprus lodged a formal complaint regarding the incident. The Consulate General of Israel to the Southeast USA called McKinney "irresponsible", accusing her of a "provocation" that endangered many. The Free Gaza movement is contemplating a suit against Israel for deliberately damaging the boat.

== See also ==
- List of Palestinian rocket attacks on Israel, 2009
- Timeline of the Gaza War (2008–2009)
- List of Israeli attacks on Gaza, 2009
- United Nations Relief and Works Agency for Palestine Refugees in the Near East
