= Killing of Israa Ghrayeb =

Reported "honor killing" in Bethlehem, Palestine

- Date: 22 August 2019; 6 years ago
- Location: Bethlehem
- Deaths: Israa Ghrayeb

The death of Israa Ghrayeb took place on 22 August 2019 in the Palestinian city of Bethlehem. Israa Ghrayeb, a 21-year-old Muslim make-up artist, was beaten to death in an "honor killing" because she posted a selfie with her fiancé a day before they were supposed to get engaged. Her family has denied the accusation, saying that instead she died of a heart attack.

== Death and investigation ==
Ghrayeb died on 22 August 2019 after sustaining injuries at her home in Beit Sahour. Her death caused protests by Palestinians, because of the accusation that it was an honour killing. Ghrayeb's family claimed that the cause of her death was a heart attack. On September 6, Palestinian authorities had three people in custody in relation to the death and conducted a forensic investigation.

On 12 September 2019 the investigation concluded that Ghrayeb died due to complications in her respiratory system caused by repeated beatings. Three family members were charged.

== Responses ==
The death of Israa Ghrayeb provoked outrage in the West Bank, with Palestinians arranging protests against the killing in Bethlehem and Ramallah.

The #WeAreAllIsraa hashtag was spread on social networks in solidarity with Ghrayeb.

Adalah Justice Project, a Palestinian Human Rights organisation, said they were "outraged and saddened" by the "heinous killing".

== See also ==
- Human rights in Palestine
