= List of Israeli attacks on Gaza in 2009 =

This is a list of attacks on the Gaza Strip in 2009 by the Israel Defense Forces and the Israeli Air Force.

== February ==
February 1
The Israeli Air Force bombed a car in the southern Gaza Strip, killing one person and wounding three others.

February 2
The IAF bombed a cluster of caravans in Mughraqa, in the central Gaza Strip, that served as a Hamas security headquarters, and two suspected sites of tunnels along the border with Egypt. .

February 4
Aircraft bombed smuggling tunnels connecting Gaza with Egypt, as well as Hamas training position in the central strip. There were no casualties in those incidents.

February 6
Four tunnels and a weapons storage facility in the southern Gaza Strip were bombed, with no casualties.

February 9, 2009
Early on Monday, the Israel Air Force hit two Hamas positions in Gaza in response to rocket attacks on Israel launched by militants in the coastal strip on the preceding day, the army said.

February 11, 2009
Israeli warplanes on late Wednesday night struck a Hamas post in the southern Gaza Strip town of Khan Younis. An Israel Defense Forces spokesman said that the strike came in response to mortar fire on the western Negev. There were no reports of casualties in the attack.

February 13, 2009
An Israeli warplane bombed a target in the Gaza Strip town of Khan Younis Friday, killing one militant and critically wounding another. IDF spokesman said the strike hit two Islamic Jihad militants who were planning a terrorist attack. Later, Israeli aircraft carried out six strikes on smuggling tunnels along the border between the Gaza Strip and Egypt. There were no reports of casualties.

Israeli soldiers shot and killed a Palestinian teenager who was throwing stones in the West Bank city of Hebron. The IDF reported that dozens of Palestinians hurled rocks at a military guard tower next to an Israeli settlement in Hebron and a soldier shot the ringleader, a 14-year-old Palestinian boy.

== March ==
March 3, 2009
Israel Air Force jets bombed six tunnels in the Gaza Strip near the border with Egypt on Tuesday in retaliation for Qassam rocket and mortar shell fire from the territory into Israel.

March 4, 2009
The attack continued with three more tunnels were bombed early Wednesday. About both days, the Israel Defense Forces spokesperson's office said that secondary explosions could be seen when one of the tunnels was targeted, indicating the presence of ammunition inside it. Gaza medical officials reported that seven people had been hurt in the attack.
March 5, 2009
An Israel Air Force strike on the Gaza Strip killed three members of the militant Islamic Jihad, according to medical sources. The IAF also hit four smuggling tunnels in the southern Gaza Strip, the army said. No one was wounded in the rocket attack on Netivot.

March 11, 2009
Israel Air Force jets bombed two smuggling tunnels in the southern Gaza Strip in retaliation for the rockets fired at Israel the previous day

March 19, 2009
Al-Aqsa Martyrs Brigades report the killing of 2 militants in a IAF strike. Israeli army does not confirm such military activity in the area of the central Gaza Strip, close to the border fence with Israel.

The Palestinian Center for Human Rights publishes a list of Palestinian killed between December 27, 2008 and January 18, 2009, stating that of those killed, 926 were civilians, 236 were combatants and 255 were members of the Palestinian security forces. Israeli government spokesman Mark Regev disputes the findings. He says Israel is working on its own list and contends that most of those killed were combatants or legitimate targets. It is notable that, by comparing the number of deaths during the conflict with the baseline continuous death rate, one can conclude that the continuous death rate over all of Gaza increased to 1.3 times its original value during Operation Cast Lead. Concurrently, a United Nations human rights investigator says that Israel's offensive against Hamas in densely populated Gaza appeared to constitute a war crime of the "greatest magnitude."

== See also ==
- List of Palestinian rocket attacks on Israel in 2009
- Timeline of the Gaza War (2008–2009)
- Incidents in the Gaza War (2008–2009)
