= List of Palestinian rocket attacks on Israel in 2009 =

The following is a list of rocket and mortar attacks on Israel in 2009 by Hamas and other Palestinian militant groups from the Gaza Strip.

Over the course of 2009, 569 rockets and 289 mortars (a total of 858) were fired from the Gaza Strip into Israel, in comparison to 2,048 rockets in 2008. Out of these, 406 were fired during the Gaza War, which ended on 18 January, and 160 were fired during the rest of the year.

== January ==
January 1, 2009 – January 18, 2009
The Gaza War, which began in late 2008, ended on January 18, 2009. For Palestinian rocket attacks on Israel during this period, see Gaza War (2008–09)#Rocket attacks into Israel.
January 31, 2009
One Grad rocket struck south of Ashkelon after a Color Red alert sounded in the city. The projectile struck an open field in the city. No injuries were reported in the attack.

== February ==
February 1, 2009
Palestinian militants in Gaza fired at least five Qassam rockets and 14 mortar shells at southern Israel.

Two Israel Defense Forces soldiers and an Israeli civilian were lightly wounded when four mortar shells fired from the Gaza Strip exploded near them in the Sha'ar Hanegev region of the western Negev.

Three rockets struck the Eshkol region, two of them landing in open fields and the third between two kindergartens. A fourth rocket struck an open field in the Sdot Negev Regional Council area and a fifth exploded in Nir Am, near the Gaza border. No casualties or damage were reported in any of the strikes.

Four mortar shells struck the Eshkol region of the western Negev earlier on Sunday, as well. No injuries or damage were caused.

Palestinian militants in Gaza fired at least one Qassam rocket and 3 mortar shells at southern Israel. The Israel Defense Forces said it targeted the gunmen who had fired the mortars.

February 3, 2009
Palestinian militants fired a Grad into Ashkelon on Tuesday. Mayor Benny Vaknin told Israel Radio that a Grad rocket "struck the heart of a residential neighbourhood". "To the best of my knowledge, when it is a Grad rocket, it is from Hamas," Vaknin said.

February 4, 2009
Palestinian militants in the Gaza Strip launched a mortar shell at southern Israel, which exploded in the Eshkol Regional Council. Three people were treated for shock after the attack, but there were no casualties.

February 6, 2009
Palestinian militants fired two rockets from the coastal strip into Israel. The first of the rockets hit the Sha'ar Hanegev region. Three hours later, a rocket hit near the coastal city of Ashkelon. The attacks caused no casualties.

February 8, 2009
Palestinian militants in the Gaza Strip fired a Grad rocket at Ashkelon. The rocket attack on the southern town caused neither casualties nor damage. Earlier that day, a Qassam rocket fired from the Gaza Strip struck the western Negev. The IDF said one car was set ablaze and several others were damaged by shrapnel. No injuries were reported.

February 10, 2009
A Qassam rocket struck the western Negev during the day of the 2009 Israeli legislative election. Palestinian militants in the Gaza Strip fired the rocket just half an hour before the polls were to close.

February 11, 2009
Palestinian militants in the Gaza Strip fired four mortar shells at the western Negev [some versions indicate only two mortar shells] during the course of the day Wednesday.

February 13, 2009
Two Qassam rockets and a mortar shell fired by Palestinian militants in the Gaza Strip exploded in the western Negev, causing no casualties or damage. One of the rockets struck an open field in the Eshkol Regional Council and about an hour later another hit near the city of Sderot.

February 15, 2009
A rocket struck southern Israel late Sunday night in the Sdot Negev area

February 16, 2009
Palestinian rockets hit Israel Monday morning. Two rockets fired from Gaza one hitting an open area in the Sha'ar Hanegev region and the other hitting inside a kibbutz in the Sdot Negev region. No injuries were reported in either incident, but some property sustained damage.
IAF jets bombed the Philadelphi route, an area of smuggling tunnels near Gaza's border with Egypt in response to the rocket fire.

February 18, 2009
On Wednesday, a Qassam rocket hit the western Negev. The rocket exploded in a field in the Sha'ar Hanegev Regional Council, causing no casualties or damage.

February 19, 2009
Five Qassam rockets were fired from the Gaza Strip into the western Negev. Two in the morning hitting the Eshkol region and three in the evening, one hitting near Sderot and the other two near Netivot. The rocket attacks caused neither casualties nor damage. The IAF bombed six smuggling tunnels along the Gaza-Egypt border in response to the morning rocket fire. The attack caused secondary blasts, according to the IDF, which showed that explosives were hit in the airstrike. There were no reports of casualties.

February 20, 2009
Gaza militants fired 10 mortar shells and a Qassam rocket into the western Negev on Friday

February 21, 2009
A rocket struck Ashkelon

February 22, 2009
Palestinian militants in the Gaza Strip on Sunday fired two mortar rounds at Israel Defense Forces soldiers near the border, Israel Radio reported. Earlier a Qassam rocket hit the western Negev. There were no casualties or damage reported in either incident.

February 23, 2009
Two Qassam rockets were fired from the Gaza Strip into the western Negev. One in the morning landed near Sderot and one in the afternoon landed near a kibbutz.

February 25, 2009
Two Qassam rockets struck the Sha'ar Hanegev region in the western Negev on Wednesday. There were no reports of casualties in either incident. As a response, The Israel Air Force bombed smuggling tunnels under the Gaza-Egypt border. There were secondary explosions, showing they contained weapons material.

February 26, 2009
Three Qassam rockets were fired from the Gaza Strip. One of the rockets damaged two houses in Sderot early in the morning and the other landed near an industrial zone. A woman and her son were treated for shock. In the evening, a rocket struck an open field in the Eshkol Region.

February 27, 2009
Two Qassam rockets were fired from Gaza. One struck the western Negev while the other hit the Sdot Hanegev area. No casualties or damage were reported in the incidents.

February 28, 2009
Ten rockets were fired from the Gaza Strip into Israel. Six rockets targeted Gaza-area communities, two hit Ashkelon, one landed in the Eshkol district and one near the Sdot Negev area. There were no casualties or property damage, with the exception of one rocket that struck an empty schoolyard in Ashkelon. The school itself was severely damaged, with shrapnel hitting some of the classrooms (including areas the Defense Ministry had defined as safe). Several people were treated for shock by paramedics who arrived at the scene. Following the attack, Deputy Mayor Cohen of Ashqelon met with the commander of the Home Front Command Southern District. They decided the school would be closed on 1 March, while its students would be sent to an alternative venue. All other schools in the city will function as usual.

== March ==
March 1, 2009
7 rockets were launched into Israel, one of which struck a yard in Sderot. No one was hurt in any of the attacks.

March 2, 2009
Palestinian militants fired a rocket into the southern city of Ashkelon from the Gaza Strip Monday evening. No one was hurt and no damage was caused in the attack.

March 5, 2009
Palestinian militants launched a barrage of Qassam rockets and mortar rounds into Israel on Thursday. They fired six Qassams from the Hamas-controlled territory into the western Negev; all struck open areas, and caused no damage or injuries. Two mortar shells struck near the Nahal Oz region, also causing no casualties.

Later on the evening, Palestinian militants fired a Grad rocket that struck a synagogue in the southern town of Netivot, causing light damage to the building. The Israel Air Force retaliated shortly after the attack, striking four smuggling tunnels in the southern Gaza Strip, the army said. No one was wounded in the rocket attack on Netivot.
In a statement issued after the strike on the tunnels, the Israel Defense Forces said: "As the sole authority in the Gaza Strip, Hamas bears full responsibility for all terror originating within its area of control. The IDF will continue to respond to any attempts to destabilize Israel's South."

March 7, 2009
At least three rockets were fired from Gaza into Israel, hitting the western Negev.

March 8, 2009
On Sunday morning, militants in Gaza fired four Qassam rockets at the western Negev. Three rockets hit the Eshkol region and one struck the Sdot Negev region. No injuries or damage were reported in any of the incidents, but the early warning siren was not activated, causing panic among some local residents.
The Israel Defense Forces reported they targeted a weapons warehouse used by militants and bombed two smuggling tunnels under the Egypt-Gaza border. Hamas security officials said that the warehouse was empty and no one was injured.

March 10, 2009
Militants fired four rockets at Israel on Tuesday, the IDF said.
On Tuesday morning, militants in Gaza fired two Qassam rockets at the western Negev. No injuries or damage were reported in either of the incidents.
Later two more rockets were fired. The Israel Defense Forces says its aircraft hit a Palestinian rocket squad in Gaza just after the militants fired the rockets. Palestinian security says three people were wounded. The airstrike took place in northern Gaza, the most frequent launching area for rockets.

March 11, 2009

Shortly afterwards, two rockets struck the Eshkol region in the western Negev. The rockets hit open areas, causing no casualties. Later, in the afternoon, two additional Qassam rockets fired from the Gaza Strip hit the western Negev, one of them striking a canister of natural gas in the Sha'ar Hanegev region. The canister did not explode, and no injuries were reported in either incident. Along the day, two Israeli "women were treated for shock." in relation with the rockets

March 13, 2009
Three rockets were fired from Gaza into Israel. One was fired in the morning hitting the Eshkol region. The other two were fired in the evening hitting the western Negev. No injuries or damage were reported.

March 14, 2009
Rockets explode inside Israel in the western Negev.

March 24, 2009
A Qassam rocket was fired at southern Israel from the Gaza Strip. The rocket landed in an open area south of Ashkelon and caused no injuries or damage.

== April ==
April 1, 2009
Three Qassam rockets were fired by Gaza militants from the Strip into Israel.
April 15, 2009
Palestinian militants fired a Qassam rocket into the western Negev on Wednesday, ending a 2-week lull in cross-border rocket fire. The rocket exploded in the Eshkol region, causing neither casualties nor property damage.
April 30, 2009
Palestinian militants fired a Qassam rocket into southern Israel. The rocket landed near a kibbutz, but "no injuries or damage" were reported.

== May ==
May 10, 2009
Palestinian militants fired a Qassam rocket into southern Israel. The rocket landed near a kibbutz, but "no damage was reported."

== June ==
"...in mid June... Palestinians fired two projectiles in the space of 24 hours."

== July ==
July 16, 2009
Palestinian militants fired a Qassam rocket into southern Israel. The rocket landed in the Sdot Negev region and no damage was reported.

== August ==
August 9, 2009
Palestinian militants fired mortars into southern Israel. During one round, the mortars landed two mortar shells struck near the Erez Crossing, just yards away from ambulances that were transferring a Palestinian heart patient to Israel for treatment." During another round, shells "landed nearby a group of IDF engineers."
August 24, 2009
Palestinian militants fired mortar shells into southern Israel. The mortar shells landed near an IDF base and injured an Israeli soldiers.
August 29, 2009
A rocket fired by Palestinian militants in the Gaza Strip "landed in the western Negev."
August 30, 2009
Palestinian militants fired mortar shells into southern Israel. The mortar shells were aimed at the Israeli civilian city of Sderot.
August 31, 2009
Palestinian militants fired rockets into southern Israel. As of the afternoon of 31 August, the landing spot for the projectiles have not been located.

== September ==
September 3, 2009
Palestinian militants fired mortar shells into southern Israel. The shells "landed in an open areas in the western Negev."

September 15, 2009

Jerusalem post reported Police: Terrorists fired 2 phosphorus shells into Israel, IDF predicts wave of rockets from Strip, including 10 yesterday, will end after Succot; IAF bombs south Gaza tunnel, killing 1 The attacks from the Gaza Strip escalated on Wednesday with 10 rockets and mortar shells fired into Israel – including two containing phosphorus – as defense officials predicted that the violence would quiet down after Succot., One of the rockets – a 122-mm. Katyusha – hit just north of Ashkelon.

September 20, 2009
Palestinian militants fired Qassam rockets into southern Israel, which "exploded in open areas in the western Negev."
September 24, 2009
Palestinian militants fired Qassam rockets into southern Israel, which "hit an open area in the Eshkol Regional Council in southern Israel. "
September 28, 2009
Palestinian militants fired Qassam rockets into southern Israel.
September 29, 2009
Palestinian militants fired Qassam rockets into southern Israel.

== October ==
October 2, 2009
Palestinian militants from the Gaza Strip fired Qassam rockets into Shaar Hanegev in southern Israel.

== November ==
November 2, 2009
A Qassam rocket was fired at Israel from the Gaza Strip, landing in an open field in the Shaar Hanegev region. No injuries or damage were reported.

November 13, 2009
A Qassam rocket was fired at Israel from the Gaza Strip, landing in an open field in the Sdot Negev regional. No injuries or damage were reported.

November 21, 2009
A Qassam rocket was fired in the morning at the city of Sderot prior to an agreement among Gaza factions to end the rocket attacks. The rocket landed in an open area in the Shaar Hanegev Regional Council causing no injuries or damage.

November 23, 2009
A Qassam rocket was fired at southern Israel 48 hours after Hamas announced "that it secured an agreement" among Gaza factions to end the rocket attacks. "[T]he rocket exploded near a kibbutz in the Sha'ar Hanegev Regional Council" causing no reported injuries or damage.

== December ==
16 December
Two rockets were fired into Israel and landed in an open area near Sderot.
30 December
A Palestinian mortar shell fired at Israel from the Gaza Strip landed in an open area in the Eshkol region. Nobody was wounded and no damage was reported.
31 December
Two Russian-made Grad rockets were fired at Israel from the Gaza Strip, one hitting the city of Netivot at around 9:30 p.m. The Red Color early warning system failed to go off. One woman suffered shock and no damage was reported. The incident marked the first instance since the Gaza War where Palestinian militants used a rocket of this type. The Israel Air Force bombed two smuggling tunnels in the Gaza Strip overnight Friday in response to a rocket fired by Gaza militants that hit the southern Israeli town of Netivot on Thursday evening. Militants from the Popular Front for the Liberation of Palestine (PFLP) claimed responsibility. Israel responded on 1 January by bombing two smuggling tunnels in the Gaza Strip. Palestinian sources said Israel struck several targets, and four people were lightly injured.

== See also ==
- Incidents in the Gaza War (2008–2009)
- Timeline of the Gaza War (2008–2009)
- List of Israeli attacks on Gaza in 2009
