= Palestinian Center for Rapprochement between Peoples =

Palestinian Center for Rapprochement between Peoples (PCR) is a non-profit and non-religious organization. The PCR is based in Beit Sahour under the aegis of the International Solidarity Movement. George Rishmawi is director of PCR. The group was established in 1988, then formally registered under the auspices of the Mennonite Central Committee in Jerusalem in 1991 and officially registered in the Palestinian Ministry of Interior in 2004. The PCR works to promote grassroots dialogue and joint work between Palestinians and people from different nationalities. Its main objective is to encourage peaceful solutions to further Palestinian nationalism through disabling existing stereotypes and prejudice. In addition, PCR works in the field of human rights and information dissemination (International Middle East Media Centre, IMEMC).

The Palestinian Centre for Rapprochement "spearheaded nonviolent resistance in Palestine throughout the First Intifada, including the 1989 tax strike called under the slo‐ gan “No Taxation Without Representation”".

Ghassan Andoni is co-founder of PCR, the current director is George N. Rishmawi.
