= International Middle East Media Center =

Palestinian independent news

The International Middle East Media Center (IMEMC) is an independent news organization run by Palestinians living in the State of Palestine, working together with international journalists, who report on events in both Israel and the State of Palestine. The IMEMC is published in English, whilst briefly providing Spanish coverage in 2008, supported by volunteers, though this was stopped due to lack of funding.

Starting as a single section of the Palestinian Centre for Rapprochement between People (PCR) website in 2002 called “Pal Media Alert”, it gained its own identity when founded as its own entity in 2003 when its own separate website was created under Ghassan Andoni. IMEMC was created as the PCR upon reviewing international media found many international sources didn't send journalists into Palestine but that they had them stationed in Jerusalem reporting from information from the Government Press Office.

"The IMEMC sought to connect media activists worldwide with the nonviolent resistance movement inside Palestine. In 2008, the IMEMC connected with community radio stations, social movements, and media activists across several conti‐ nents to produce Radio Free Palestine'.

As of 2021, IMEMC has been a project that is supported by the American-based nonprofit organization If Americans Knew.

== See also ==
- The Electronic Intifada
- Independent Media Center
