= Israeli demolition of Palestinian property =

War method used by the Israelis against Palestinians

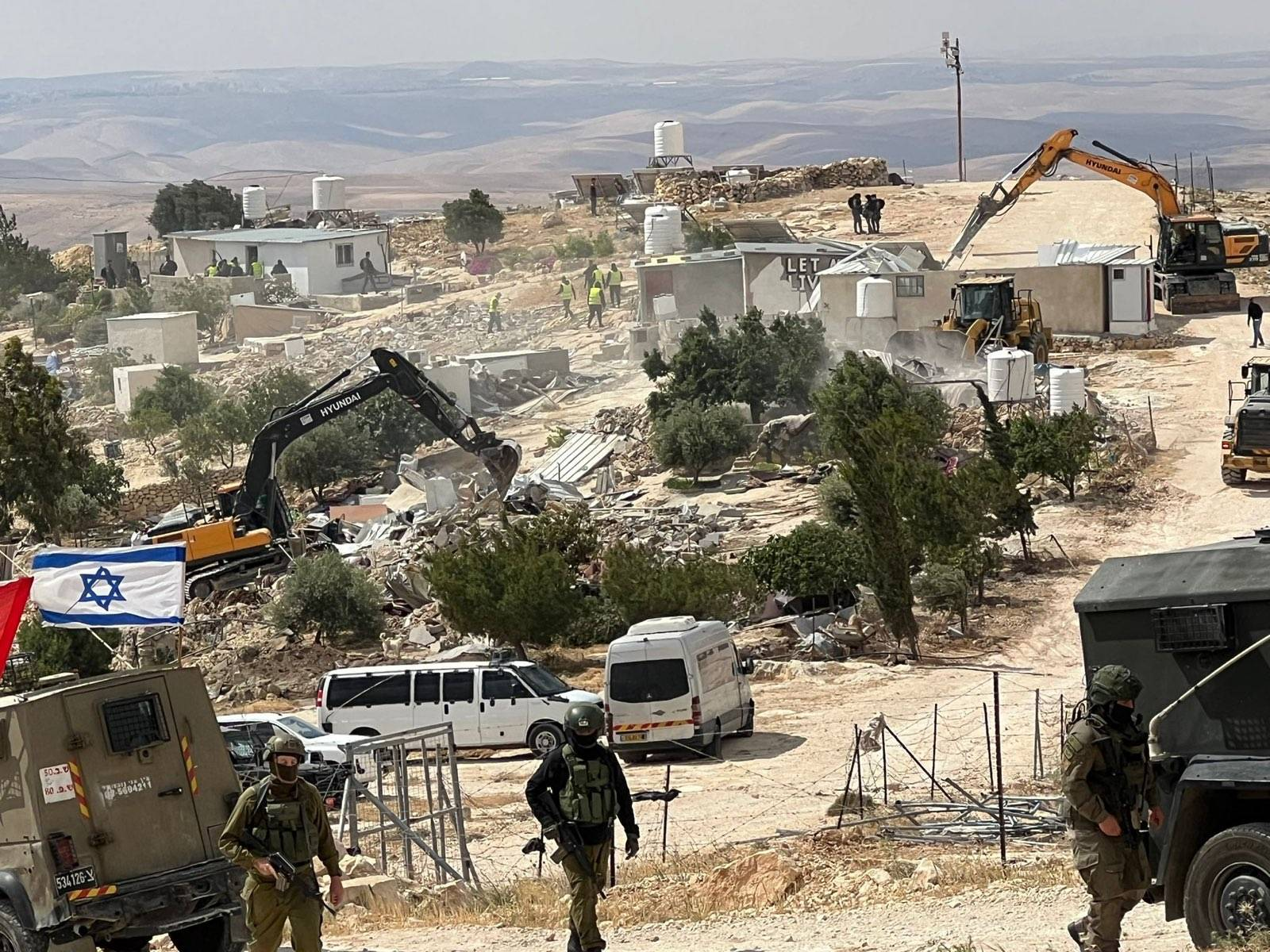
On May 5, 2025, the Israeli army destroyed several houses and cave dwellings in Khallet Al-Dabaa, in the occupied West Bank. In total, 21 Palestinian children and 28 Palestinian adults were forcibly displaced.

Demolition of Palestinian property is a method Israel has used in the Israeli-occupied territories since they came under its control in the Six-Day War, as well as in Israel proper, to achieve various aims. Broadly speaking, demolitions can be classified as either administrative, punitive/dissuasive and as part of military operations. The Israeli Committee Against House Demolitions estimated that Israel had razed 55,048 Palestinian structures as of 2022. In the first several months of the ongoing Gaza war, Israel further demolished over 2,000 Palestinian homes in the West Bank. Furthermore, Israel has demolished homes within its borders, targeting Bedouin and Palestinian Druze communities. Israel justifies these demolitions by claiming that the houses are built without permits. Arab Israeli communities have argued that getting building permits in Israel is exceedingly difficult for Palestinian citizens. Administrative house demolitions are done to enforce building codes and regulations, which in the occupied Palestinian territories are set by the Israeli military. Critics claim that they are used as a means to Judaize parts of the occupied territory, especially East Jerusalem. Punitive house demolitions involve demolishing houses of Palestinians or neighbors and relatives of Palestinians suspected of violent acts against Israelis. These target the homes where the suspects live. Proponents of the method claim that it deters violence while critics claim that it has not been proven effective and might even trigger more violence. Punitive house demolitions have been criticized by a Palestinian human rights organization as a form of collective punishment and thus a war crime under international law.

== Method ==
Demolitions are carried out by the Israeli Army Combat Engineering Corps using armored bulldozers, usually Caterpillar D9, but also with excavators (for high multi-story buildings) and wheel loaders (for small houses with low risk) modified by the IDF. The heavily armored IDF Caterpillar D9 is often used when there is a risk demolishing the building (such as when armed insurgents are barricaded inside or the structure is rigged with explosives and booby traps). Multi-story buildings, flats, and explosive laboratories are demolished by explosive devices, set by IDF demolition experts of Yaalom's Sayeret Yael. Amnesty International has also described house demolitions that were carried out by the IDF using "powerful explosive charges".

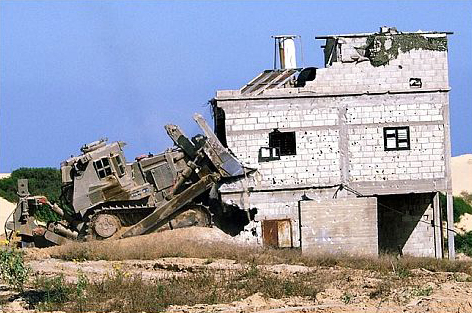
An IDF Caterpillar D9 armored bulldozer razing a house during the Second Intifada (2000–2005)

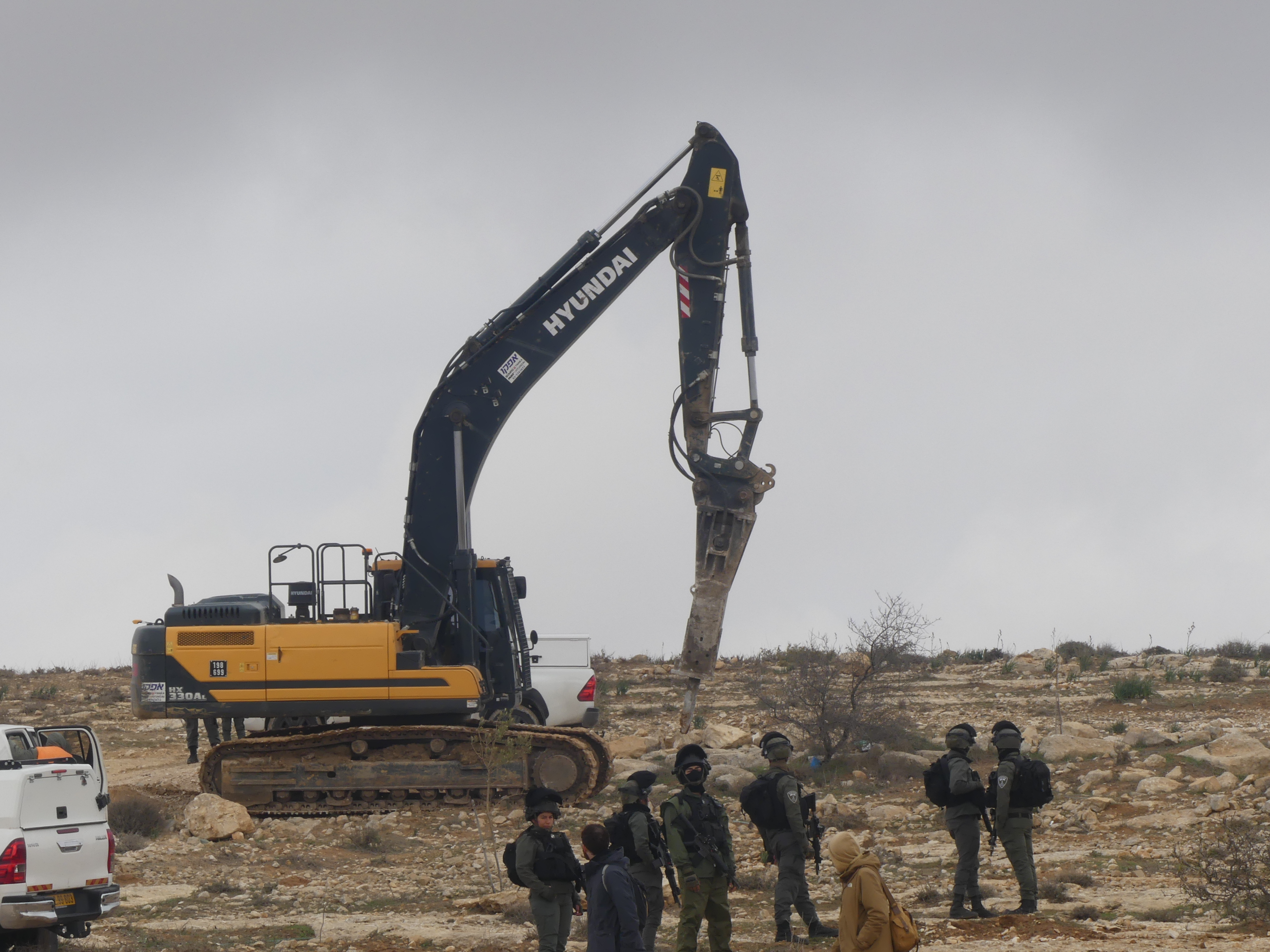
Excavator used by the Israeli army to demolish Palestinian homes, photo taken in Masafer Yatta, February 10, 2025

== Administrative demolition ==
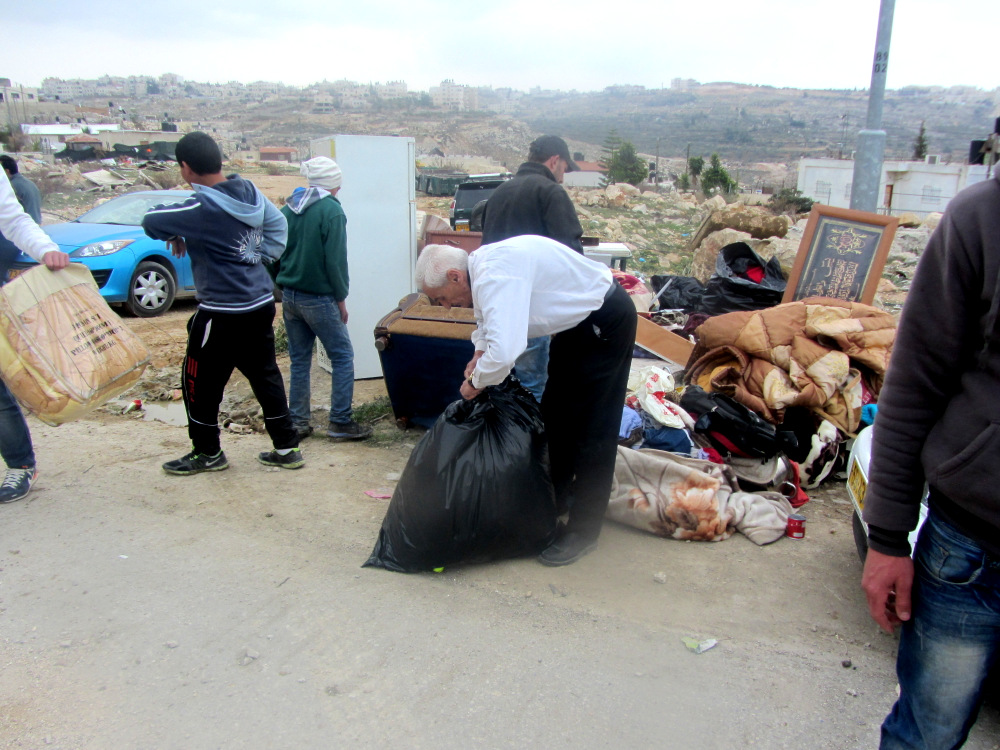
A family collecting their belongings after a demolition in Beit Hanina, 2014)

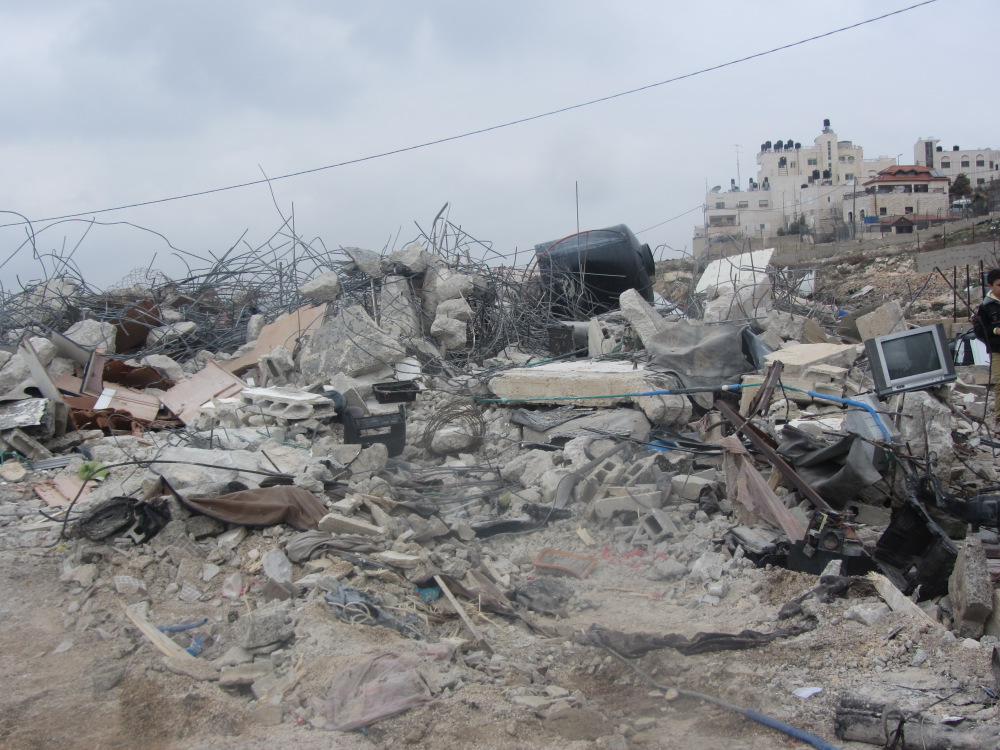
Two demolished apartment homes in Beit Hanina, 2014)

Some house demolitions are allegedly performed because the houses may have been built without permits, or are in violation of various building codes, ordinances, or regulations. Amnesty International claims that Israeli authorities are in fact systematically denying building permit requests in Arab areas as a means of appropriating land. This is disputed by Israeli sources, who claim that both Arabs and Jews enjoy a similar rate of application approvals.

Dr. Meir Margalit of Israeli Committee Against House Demolitions writes:

"The thinking is that a national threat calls for a national response, invariably aggressive. Accordingly, a Jewish house without a permit is an urban problem; but a Palestinian home without a permit is a strategic threat. A Jew building without a permit is 'cocking a snook at the law'; a Palestinian doing the same is defying Jewish sovereignty over Jerusalem."

== Punitive demolition ==
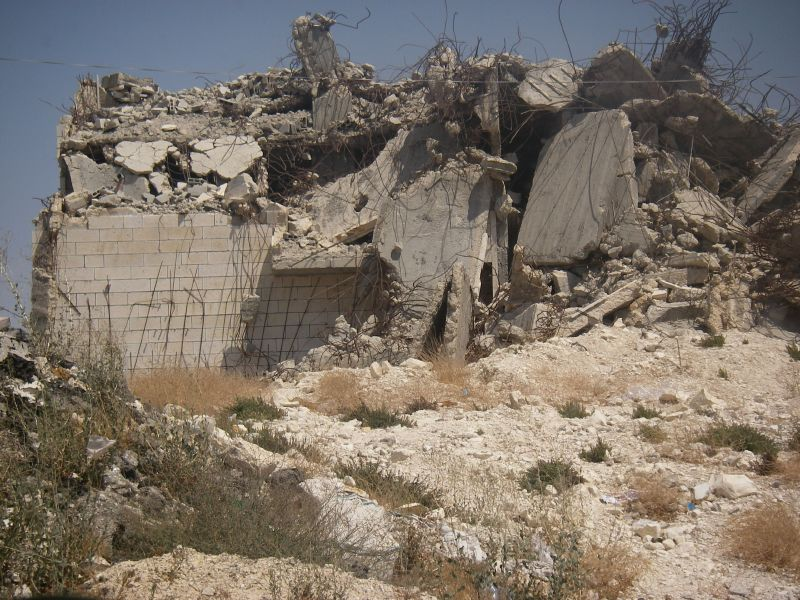
A Palestinian home after demolition by Israeli military forces

Although revoked by the British the Mandatory Palestine Defence (Emergency) Regulations were adopted by Israel on its formation. These regulations gave authority to military commanders to confiscate and raze "any house, structure or land... the inhabitants of which he is satisfied have committed... any offence against these Regulations involving violence."

In 1968, after Israel occupied the West Bank and Gaza, Theodor Meron, then legal adviser to the Israeli Foreign Ministry, advised the Prime Minister's office in a top secret memorandum that house demolitions, even of suspected terrorists' residences, violated the 1949 Fourth Geneva Convention on the protection of civilians in war. Undertaking such measures, as though they were in continuity with British mandatory emergency regulations, might be useful as hasbara but were "legally unconvincing". The advice was ignored. His view, according to Gershom Gorenberg, is shared by nearly all scholars of international law, prominent Israeli experts included. The practice of demolishing Palestinian houses began within two days of the conquest of the area in the Old City of Jerusalem known as the Moroccan Quarter, adjacent to the Western Wall. One of the first measures adopted, without legal authorization, on the conquest of Jerusalem in 1967 was to evict 650 Palestinians from their homes in the heart of Jerusalem, and reduce their homes and shrines to rubble in order to make way for the construction of the plaza. From the outset of the occupation of the Palestinian territories up to 2019, according to an estimate by the ICAHD, Israel has razed 49,532 Palestinian structures, with a concomitant displacement of hundreds of thousands of Palestinians. Israel regards its practice as a form of deterrence of terrorism, since a militant is thereby forced to consider the effect of his actions on his family. Before the First Intifada, the measure was considered to be used only in exceptional circumstances, but with that uprising it became commonplace, no longer requiring the Defense Minister's approval but a measure left to the discretion of regional commanders. Israel demolished 103 houses in 1987; the following year the number rose to 423. 510 Palestinian homes of men alleged to be involved in or convicted of security offenses, or because the homes were said to function as screens for actions hostile to the Israeli army or settlers, were demolished. A further 110 were shelled in the belief armed men were inside, and overall another 1,497 were razed for lacking Israeli building permits, leaving an estimated 10,000 children homeless. Between September 2000 and the end of 2004, of the 4,100 homes the IDF razed in the territories, 628, housing 3,983 people, were undertaken as punishment because a member of a family had been involved in the Second Intifada. From 2006 until 31 August 2018, Israel demolished at least 1,360 Palestinian residential units in the West Bank (not including East Jerusalem), causing 6,115 people – including at least 3,094 minors – to lose their homes. 698 of these, homes to 2,948 Palestinians of whom 1,334 were minors, were razed in the Jordan Valley (January 2006–September 2017). Violations of building codes are a criminal offense in Israeli law, and this was only extended to the West Bank in 2007. Israel has demolished or compelled the owners to demolish, 1097 homes in East Jerusalem between 2004 and 2020, leaving 3,579 people of whom 1,899 minors, homeless. The number of homes demolished in the rest of the West Bank from 2006 until 30 September 2018 is estimated to be at least 1,373, resulting in homelessness for 6,133 Palestinians, including 3,103 minors. No settler has ever been prosecuted for engaging in such infractions, and only 3% of reported violations by settlers have led to demolitions. Even huts by shepherds, on which taxes have been duly paid, can be demolished. (Note: "An old man, Salim Id Al-Hathalin, grabs hold of me. He is waving papers - one a receipt from the tax authorities, confirming that he has paid taxes on the land he owns here in the village; the other a demolition order issued by the Civil Administration against his makeshift tent-cum-hut, which he points out to me as he cries: 'Why do they want to destroy my house? Where can I go? Can I go to America? I have nothing and they want to take that nothing from me. Can you help me? Where am I supposed to go?'")

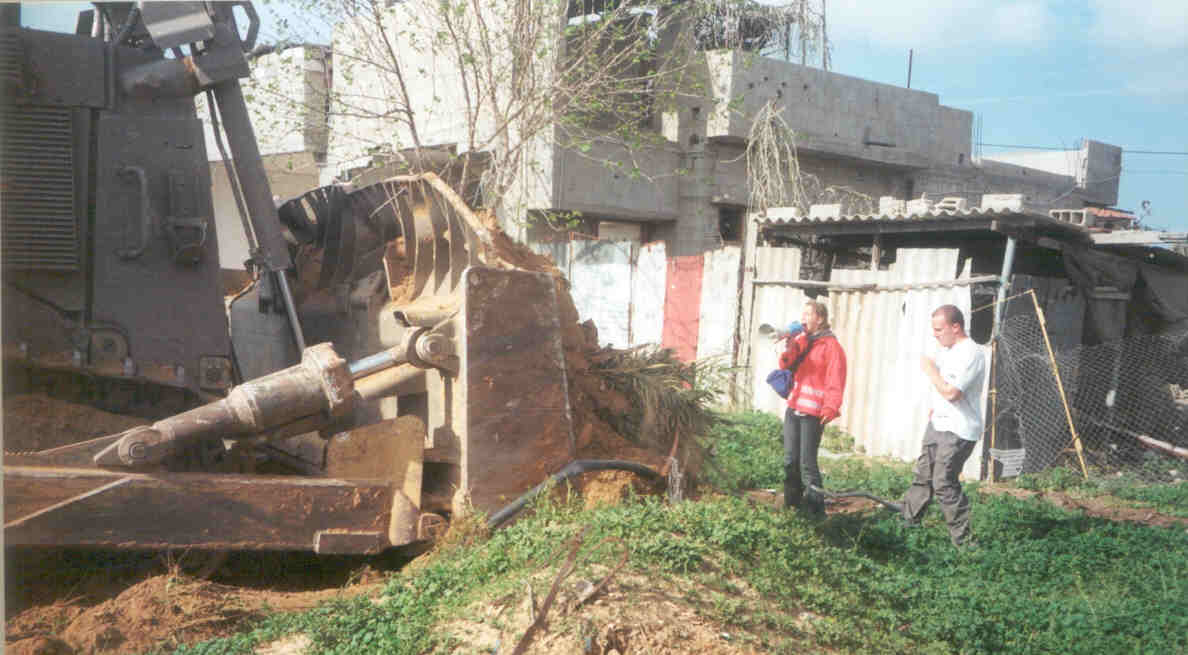
American peace activist Rachel Corrie opposing the demolition of Palestinian homes in Rafah by Israeli military bulldozers, hours before they crushed her, on March 16, 2003.

During the Second Intifada, the IDF adopted a policy of house demolition following a wave of suicide bombings. Israel justified the policy on the basis of deterrence against terrorism, and providing an incentive for families of potential suicide bombers to dissuade the bomber from attacking. Demolitions can also occur in the course of fighting. During Operation Defensive Shield, several IDF soldiers were killed early in the conflict while searching houses containing militants. In response, the IDF started employing a tactic of surrounding such houses, calling on the occupants (civilian and militant) to exit, and demolishing the house on top of the militants that do not surrender. This tactic, called nohal sir lachatz (Hebrew: נוהל סיר לחץ, lit. 'pressure pot'), is now used whenever feasible (i.e., non-multi rise building that is separated from other houses). In some heavy fighting incidents, especially in the 2002 Battle of Jenin and Operation Rainbow in Rafah 2004, heavily armored IDF Caterpillar D9 bulldozers were used to demolish houses to widen alleyways, uncover tunnels, or to secure locations for IDF troops. The result was an indiscriminate use of demolitions against civilian housing unconnected to terrorism that left 1,000 people homeless in the Rafah Refugee Camp.

According to a report by Amnesty International in 1999, house demolitions are usually done without prior warning and the home's inhabitants are given little time to evacuate. According to a 2004 Human Rights Watch report, many families in Rafah own a "cluster of homes". For example, the family may own a "small house from earlier days in the camp, often with nothing more than an asbestos roof". Later, sons will build homes nearby when they start their own families.

In February 2005, the Ministry of Defense ordered an end to the demolition of houses for the purpose of punishing the families of suicide bombers unless there is "an extreme change in circumstances". However, house demolitions continue for other reasons.

In 2009, after a string of fatal attacks by Palestinians against Israelis in Jerusalem, the Israeli High Court of Justice ruled in favor of the IDF to seal with cement the family homes of supposed Palestinian terrorists as a deterrent against terrorism. As a punitive measure, one study by a Northwestern and Hebrew University group concluded that prompt demolitions brought about a lowering of suicide attacks for a month and that they are an effective deterrent against terrorism. They are related to the identity of the house's owner, and result in a "significant decrease" of Palestinian terrorists attacks. Conversely, an internal IDF report of 2005, analyzing the effectiveness of the policy during the Second Intifada in which 3,000 civilian homes were demolished, found that terror attacks increased after house demolitions, only stimulated hatred of Israel, the damage caused outweighed any benefits, and recommended the practice be dropped.

Amnesty International has criticized the lack of due process in the use of house demolitions by Israel. Many demolitions are carried out with no warning or opportunity for the householder to appeal. In 2002, a proposed demolition case was appealed to the Israeli Supreme Court who ruled that there must be a right to appeal unless doing so would "endanger the lives of Israelis or if there are combat activities in the vicinity." In a later ruling, the Supreme Court decided that demolitions without advanced warning or due process can be carried out if advance notice would hinder demolition. Amnesty describes this as "a virtual green light" to demolition with no warning.

Palestinian identity is deeply impregnated with the sense of national loss and place engendered by the Nakba, and according to physicians studying West Bankers who have had their homes destroyed, such events cause a retraumatization of the Nakba in the families affected.

On 8 July 2021, Israeli army forces demolished a luxurious mansion in Turmus Ayya which was the family home of Sanaa Shalabi, who lived alone there with three of her seven children. She was the estranged wife of Muntasir Shalabi, a Palestinian-American who murdered an Israeli citizen in May. The wife has been separated from Muntasir since 2008, and her husband had married three other women in the meantime, and stayed in the home two months every year for family visits. The U.S. Embassy in Israel stated that "the home of an entire family should not be demolished for the actions of one individual." Gideon Levy called this demolition an instance of apartheid since Jewish terrorists never have their family homes destroyed.

== Statistics ==
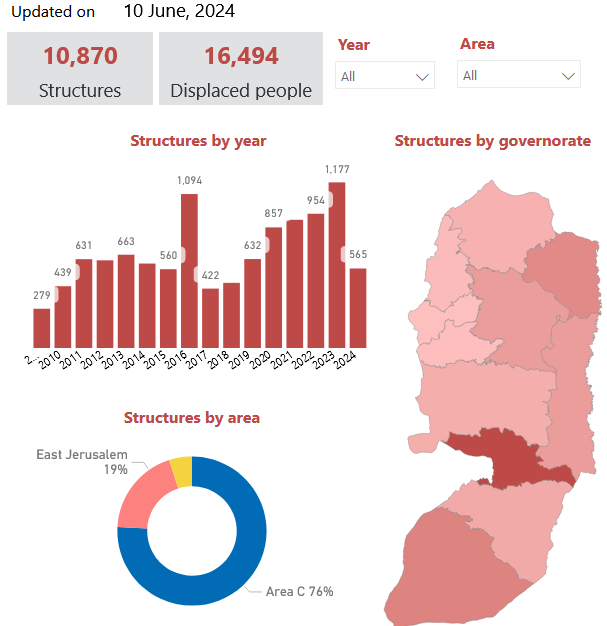
Demolition of Palestinian-owned structures and the resulting displacement of people from their homes across the West Bank since 2009. Source OCHA.

At least 741 Palestinians in the occupied West Bank and East Jerusalem were made homeless between January and 30 September 2020 due to demolitions, according to data compiled by Israeli rights group B'tselem.

As of August 23, 2020, 89 residential units were demolished in East Jerusalem, compared to 104 in 2019 and 72 in 2018. In the first three weeks of August, 24 homes were demolished.

The Palestinian village Aqabah, located in the northeastern West Bank, is threatened by demolition orders issued by the Israeli Civil Administration against the entire village. The Civil Administration had previously expropriated large areas of privately registered land in the village, and as of May 2008 it has threatened to demolish the following structures: the mosque, the British government-funded medical clinic, the internationally funded kindergarten, the Rural Women's Association building, the roads, the water tank, and nearly all private homes. According to the Rebuilding Alliance, a California-based organization that opposes house demolitions, Haj Sami Sadek, the mayor of the village, has circulated an open letter asking for assistance. Gush Shalom, the Israeli Peace Bloc, and the Israeli Committee Against House Demolitions are said to be supporting the campaign.

=== Recent conflicts ===
House demolition has been used in an on-again-off-again fashion by the Israeli government during the Second Intifada. More than 3,000 homes have been destroyed in this way. House demolition was used to destroy the family homes of Saleh Abdel Rahim al-Souwi, perpetrator of the 1994 Dizengoff Street bus bombing, and Yahya Ayyash, Hamas's chief bomb maker, known as "the engineer", as well as the alleged perpetrators of the first and second 1996 Jaffa Road bus bombings, and the Ashkelon bus station bombing.

According to Peace Now, approvals for building in Israeli settlements in East Jerusalem had expanded by 60% after Donald Trump became US president in 2017. Since 1991, Palestinians who make up the majority of the residents in the area have only received 30% of the building permits.

=== Area C ===
According to B'tselem, since the 1993 Oslo Accords Israel has issued over 14,600 demolition orders for Palestinian infrastructure, of which it has destroyed roughly 2,925. In the period 2000-2012, Palestinian were given only 211 permits to build, from 2009 to 2012, only 27 permits were given. In 2014, according to Ma'an News Agency, citing Bimkom, only one such permit was issued. On 7 July 2021, the Norwegian Refugee Council (NRC) said Israel declared Humsa al-Bqai'a a "closed military area" and blocked access for international observers. The NRC said that Israeli authorities must "immediately halt attempts to forcibly transfer around 70 Palestinians, including 35 children" following the Bedouin community's property being demolished for the seventh time since November 2020.

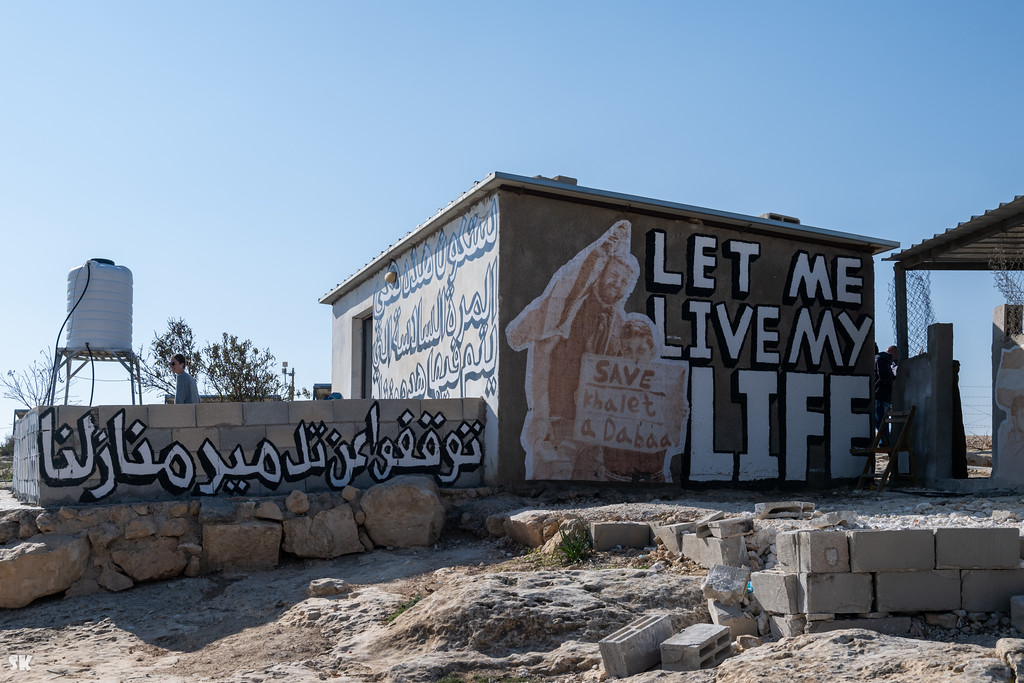
Inscription on a house in Masafer Yatta, a village in Palestine, threatened with destruction by the Israeli occupation, January 2023

The same house was destroyed in June 2025 by Israeli bulldozers.

== Legal status ==
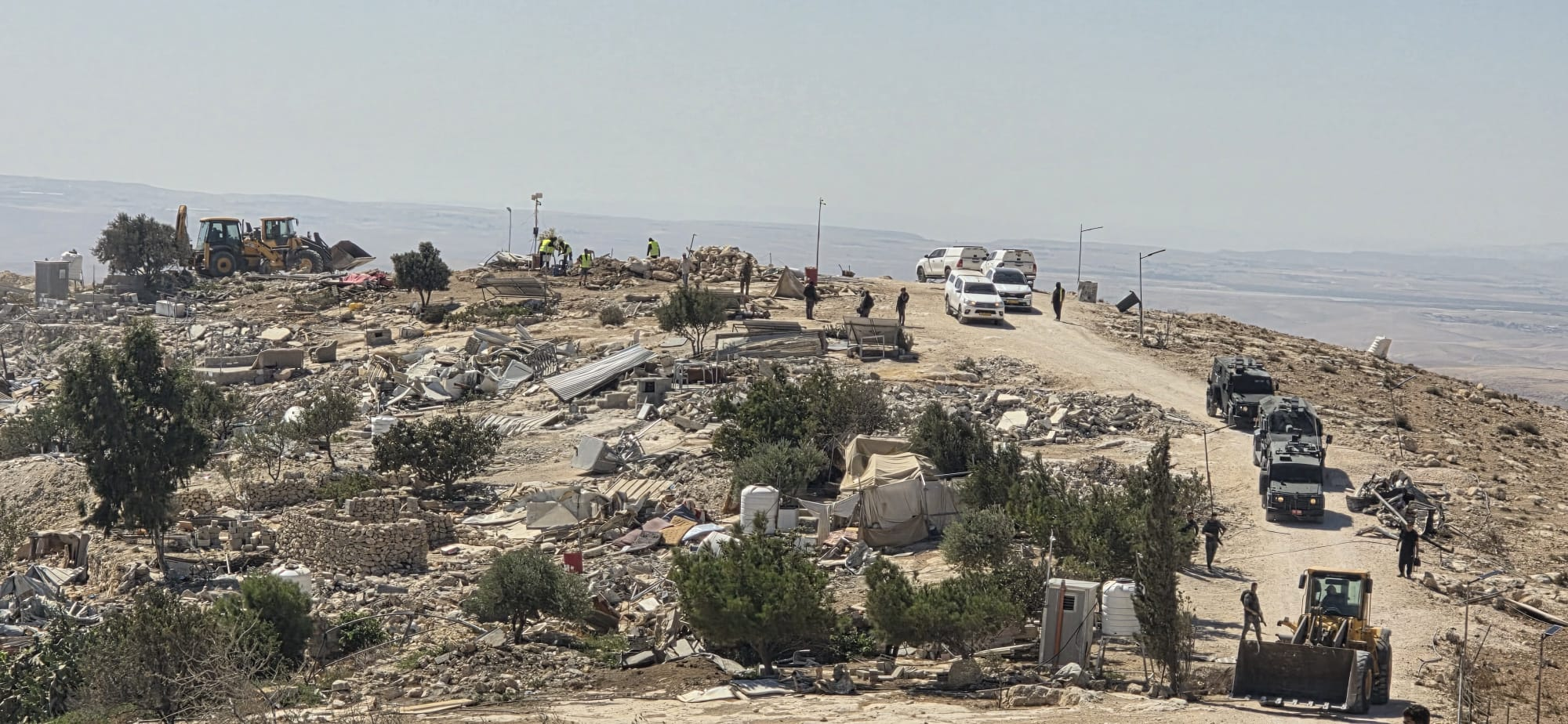
Israeli demolition of Khallit al-Dabe' in Masafer Yatta following a settler pogrom, September 2025

The use of house demolition under international law is today governed by the Fourth Geneva Convention, enacted in 1949, which protects non-combatants in occupied territories. Article 53 provides that "Any destruction by the Occupying Power of real or personal property belonging individually or collectively to private persons ... is prohibited, except where such destruction is rendered absolutely necessary by military operations." House demolition is considered a form of collective punishment. According to the law of occupation, the destruction of property, save for reasons of absolute military necessity, is prohibited.

However, Israel, which is a party to the Fourth Geneva Convention, asserts that the terms of the Convention are not applicable to the Palestinian territories on the grounds that the territories do not constitute a state which is a party to the Fourth Geneva Convention. This position is rejected by human rights organisations such as Amnesty International, which notes that "it is a basic principle of human rights law that international human rights treaties are applicable in all areas in which states parties exercise effective control, regardless of whether or not they exercise sovereignty in that area."

== Justification and criticism ==
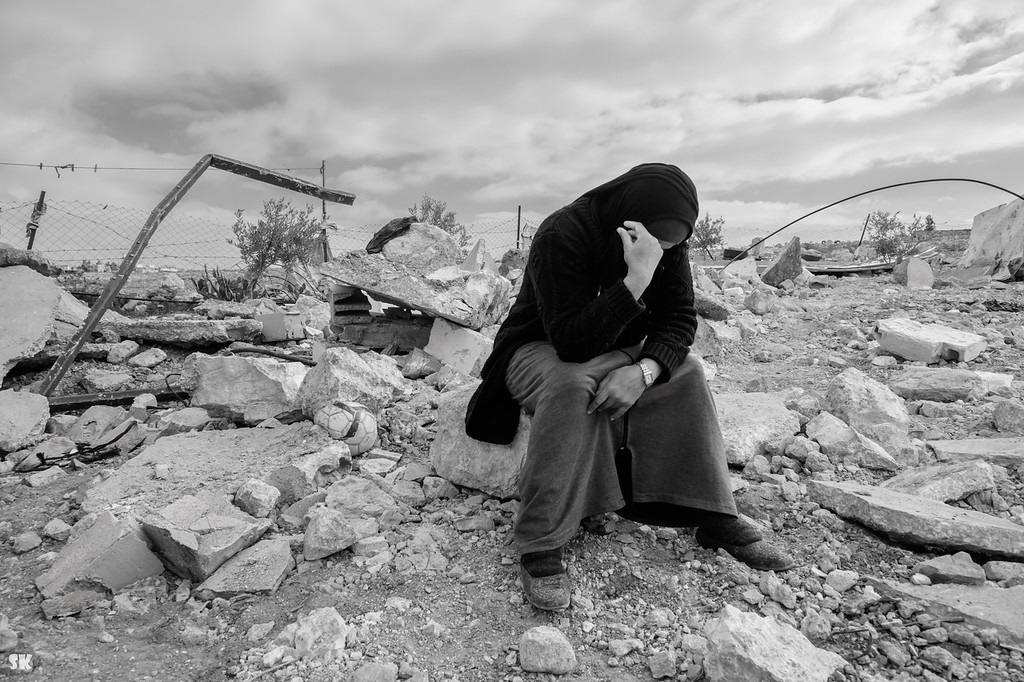
Woman sitting on the ruins of her house destroyed by Israeli authorities in Masafer Yatta, January 2023

=== Justification ===
In May 2004, the Israeli Foreign Ministry publicly stated:

"...other means employed by Israel against terrorists is the demolition of homes of those who have carried out suicide attacks or other grave attacks, or those who are responsible for sending suicide bombers on their deadly missions. Israel has few available and effective means in its war against terrorism. This measure is employed to provide effective deterrence of the perpetrators and their dispatchers, not as a punitive measure. This practice has been reviewed and upheld by the High Court of Justice"

House demolition is typically justified by the IDF on the basis of:

- Deterrence, achieved by deterring the relatives of those who carry out, or are suspected of involvement in carrying out, attacks. Benmelech, Berrebi and Klor call demolitions of this type, targeting the homes of terror operatives "punitive demolitions".
- The following types are labelled as "precautionary demolitions" by Benmelech, Berrebi and Klor, however punishing they may feel to the impacted families.
  - Counter-terrorism, by destroying militant facilities such as bomb laboratories, weapons factories, weapons and ammunition warehouses, headquarters, offices, and others.
  - Forcing out an individual barricaded inside a house, which may be rigged with explosives, without risking soldiers' lives.
  - Self-defence, by destroying possible hideouts and rocket-propelled grenade or gun posts.
  - Combat engineering, clearing a path for tanks and armoured personnel carriers.
  - Destroying structures rigged with booby traps and explosives in order to prevent risk to soldiers and civilians.

Israeli historian Yaacov Lozowick, however, implied that there is a moral basis for demolishing the houses of families of suicide bombers, stating:

Demolishing the homes of civilians merely because a family member has committed a crime is immoral. If, however,... potential suicide murderers... will refrain from killing out of fear that their mothers will become homeless, it would be immoral to leave the Palestinian mothers untouched in their homes while Israeli children die on their school buses.

—

=== Criticism ===
United Nations agencies and human rights groups such as Amnesty International and the International Committee of the Red Cross who oppose the house demolitions reject the IDF's claims, and document numerous instances where they argue the IDF's claims do not apply. They accuse the Israeli government and IDF of other motives:

- Collective punishment, the punishment of an innocent Palestinian "for an offence he or she has not personally committed."
- Taking over West Bank Palestinian land by annexation to build the Israeli West Bank barrier or to create, expand or otherwise benefit Israeli settlements.

In 2004, Human Rights Watch published the report Razing Rafah: Mass Home Demolitions in the Gaza Strip. The report documented what it described as a "pattern of illegal demolitions" by the IDF in Rafah, a refugee camp and city at the southern end of the Gaza Strip on the border with Egypt where sixteen thousand people lost their homes after the Israeli government approved a plan to expand the de facto "buffer zone" in May 2004. The IDF's main stated rationales for the demolitions were responding to and preventing attacks on its forces and the suppression of weapons smuggling through tunnels from Egypt.

The effectiveness of house demolitions as a deterrence has been questioned. In 2005, an Israeli Army commission to study house demolitions found no proof of effective deterrence and concluded that the damage caused by the demolitions overrides its effectiveness. As a result, the IDF approved the commission's recommendations to end punitive demolitions of Palestinian houses.

A number of human rights organizations, including Human Rights Watch and the ICAHD, oppose the practice. Human Rights Watch has argued that the practice violates international laws against collective punishment, the destruction of private property, and the use of force against civilians. According to Amnesty International, "The destruction of Palestinian homes, agricultural land and other property in the Occupied Territories, including East Jerusalem, is inextricably linked with Israel's long-standing policy of appropriating as much as possible of the land it occupies, notably by establishing Israeli settlements." In October 1999, during the "Peace Process" and before the start of the Second Intifada, Amnesty International wrote that: "well over one third of the Palestinian population of East Jerusalem live under threat of having their house demolished. ... Threatened houses exist in almost every street and it is probable that the great majority of Palestinians live in or next to a house due for demolition."

"House demolitions ostensibly occur because the homes are built 'illegally' – i.e. without a permit. Officials and spokespersons of the Israeli government have consistently maintained that the demolition of Palestinian houses is based on planning considerations and is carried out according to the law. ... But the Israeli policy has been based on discrimination. Palestinians are targeted for no other reasons than that they are Palestinians. ... [Israel has] discriminated in the application of the law, strictly enforcing planning prohibitions where Palestinian houses are built and freely allowing amendments to the plans to promote development where Israelis are setting up settlements."

In May 2008, a UN agency said that thousands of Palestinians in the occupied West Bank risk being displaced as the Israeli authorities threaten to tear down their homes and in some cases entire communities. "To date, more than 3,000 Palestinian-owned structures in the West Bank have pending demolition orders, which can be immediately executed without prior warning," the UN Office for Coordination of Humanitarian Affairs said in a report.

Supreme Court justice Menachem Mazuz, who retired from the court in April 2021, was one of the few justices who opposed house demolitions due to the actions of a family member. He told Haaretz that

I went against the stream explicitly and consciously. I considered demolishing homes to be immoral, contrary to the law and of dubious effectiveness. My feeling was that it was done to placate public opinion, and that the leadership, too, is aware that this is not what will prevent the next act of terror."

In 2009, the then US Secretary of State Hillary Clinton criticized the Israeli government's plans to demolish Palestinian homes in East Jerusalem, calling the action a violation of international obligations.

=== Commentary and analysis ===
A January 2015 efficacy study by Efraim Benmelech, Berrebi and Klor distinguishes between "punitive demolitions", in which homes belonging to the families of terror operatives are demolished, and "precautionary demolitions", such as the demolition of a house well-positioned for use by Palestinian snipers. Their results, which The New Republic calls "politically explosive," indicate that "precautionary demolitions" have caused suicide attacks to increase, a "48.7 percent increase in the number of suicide terrorists from an average district," while in the months immediately following a demolition, punitive demolitions caused terror attacks to decline by between 11.7 and 14.9 percent. However, Klor later described the effect of punitive demolitions as "small, localized and diminish[ing] over time" and suggested that the real reason they were carried out was "to placate the Israeli public".

== See also ==
- Bulldozer politics
- Destruction of cultural heritage during the Gaza war
- Destruction of cultural heritage by the Islamic State
- Forced displacement
- Internally displaced person
- 2014 Israel–Gaza conflict § Destruction of homes
- Roof knocking
- Israeli apartheid
- Rachel Corrie

== Sources ==
- Al-Krenawai, Alean; Graham, John R.; Sehwail, Mahmud A. (Spring 2004). "Mental Health and Violence/Trauma in Palestine: Implications for Helping Professional Practice". Journal of Comparative Family Studies. 35 (2): 185–209. doi:10.3138/jcfs.35.2.185. JSTOR 41603932.
- Bregman, Ahron (2014). Cursed Victory: A History of Israel and the Occupied Territories. Penguin UK. ISBN 978-1-846-14735-7.
- "The Jordan Valley". B'Tselem. 11 November 2017c. Archived from the original on 22 April 2020.
- "Statistics on demolition of houses built without permits in the West Bank (Not including East Jerusalem)". B'Tselem. September 2018a. Archived from the original on 2019-10-26.
- "Statistics on demolition of houses built without permits in East Jerusalem". B'Tselem. 3 January 2021. Archived from the original on 2021-03-11.
- "Statistics on demolition of houses built without permits in the West Bank (Not including East Jerusalem)". B'Tselem. 22 October 2018d. Archived from the original on 26 October 2019.
- Efrat, Elisha (2006). The West Bank and Gaza Strip: A Geography of Occupation and Disengagement. Routledge. ISBN 978-1-134-17217-7. Archived from the original on 2023-03-03.
- Graff, James A. (2015). "Targeting Children: Rights versus Realpolitik". In Kapitan, Tomis (ed.). Philosophical Perspectives on the Israeli-Palestinian Conflict (2nd ed.). Routledge. pp. 157–184. ISBN 978-1-317-46285-9.
- Hiltermann, Joost R. (Winter 1990). "Israel's Strategy to Break the Uprising". Journal of Palestine Studies. 19 (3): 87–98. doi:10.2307/2537415. JSTOR 2537415.
- Hiltermann, Joost R. (1995). "Teddy Kollek and the Native Question". In Moors, Annelies; van Teeffelen, Toine; Kanaana, Sharif; Ghazaleh, Ilham Abu (eds.). Discourse and Palestine: Power, Text and Context. Het Spinhuis. pp. 55–65. ISBN 978-9-055-89010-1. *"Israel: 50 Years of Occupation Abuses". Human Rights Watch. 4 June 2017a. Archived from the original on 14 February 2020.
- Overview of Israel's Demolition Policy (PDF). Israeli Committee Against House Demolitions. December 2017. Archived from the original (PDF) on 2020-08-22.
- Shafir, Gershon (2017). A Half Century of Occupation: Israel, Palestine, and the World's Most Intractable Conflict. University of California Press. ISBN 978-0-520-29350-2.
- Shahak, Israel (Autumn 1974). "Ethos of Conflict of the Palestinian Society". Journal of Palestine Studies. 4 (1): 181–186. doi:10.2307/2535945. JSTOR 2535945.
- Shulman, David D. (2018). Freedom and Despair: Notes from the South Hebron Hills. University of Chicago Press. ISBN 978-0-226-56665-8.
- Tolan, Sandy (2015). Children of the Stone: The Power of Music in a Hard Land. Bloomsbury Publishing. p. 56. ISBN 978-1-608-19817-7.
- Adem, Seada Hussein (5 April 2019). Palestine and the International Criminal Court. Springer. ISBN 978-94-6265-291-0.
- European Union (May 28, 2020). Six-Month Report on Demolitions and Seizures in the West Bank, including East JerusalemReporting Period: 1 July–31December2019 (PDF) (Report).
- Diakonia (June 2019). Demolishing the Future: Continued Property Destruction in the Occupied Palestinian Territory (PDF) (Report).
- Reynolds, John (November 16, 2017). "Repressive inclusion". The Journal of Legal Pluralism and Unofficial Law. 49 (3): 268–293. doi:10.1080/07329113.2017.1388100. S2CID 220316137.
