= Israeli Committee Against House Demolitions =

Organization

- הוועד הישראלי נגד הריסת בתים
- Founded: 1997
- Founder: Jeff Halper; Amos Gvirtz; Rabbi Arik Ascherman; Meir Margalit; Yoav Hess; Yael Cohen
- Purpose: "Israeli demolition of Palestinian houses in the Occupied Territories"
- Location(s): Main Office – Jerusalem, Israel; U.S. branch – Chapel Hill, North Carolina; U.K branch – London; Norwegian branch – Tromsø
- Region served: Israel, Palestinian Territories
- Method: "non-violent, direct-action", domestic and international advocacy, rebuilding of demolished homes, developing informational materials and tours
- Key people: Jeff Halper – Director/Coordinator; Salim Shawamreh; Hibat Mahroum
- Employees: 8
- Website: www.icahd.org

The Israeli Committee Against House Demolitions (ICAHD) (Hebrew: הוועד הישראלי נגד הריסת בתים) is a group opposed to Israeli settlements, which describes itself as "an Israeli peace and human rights organization dedicated to ending the occupation of the Palestinian territories and achieving a just peace between Israelis and Palestinians."

ICAHD says it uses non-violent, direct-action means of resistance to end Israel's policy of demolishing Palestinian homes in the occupied territories."

ICAHD was founded by eight activists (see box), among whom was Jeff Halper, a long-time human rights advocate and professor of anthropology, who serves as ICAHD's Director. Halper describes ICAHD as "a critical, 'radical' organization which can envision a single democratic state in Palestine/Israel."

== Activities ==
ICAHD's activities, which are based on nonviolent direct action, include exhibits, films, workshops, tours of the occupied territories, publication of books and articles on the Israeli occupation of the West Bank, East Jerusalem and Gaza, international advocacy.

ICAHD also organizes the rebuilding of demolished Palestinian houses using a network of Israeli, Palestinian and international volunteers. In April 2012 founding member Meir Margalit estimated that the organization had rebuilt 1,000 homes including 200 in East Jerusalem.

In addition to rebuilding demolished Palestinian houses, ICAHD often takes legal actions on behalf of Palestinians whose houses have been demolished or are threatened with demolition (see example of Aqabah).
Members of ICAHD have been arrested numerous times by the Israeli army and police for attempting to prevent the demolition of Palestinian homes. Most recently, on 3 April 2008, ICAHD Coordinator Jeff Halper was arrested for the eighth time while nonviolently protesting the bulldozing of the home of the Hamdan family in a Palestinian neighborhood of Jerusalem – a house that had already been torn down once by Israeli authorities and had been rebuilt by ICAHD.

In April 2012 one of ICAHD's founders, Meir Margalit was questioned by the Israeli Interior Ministry. Margalit, who admitted being involved in the rebuilding of over 200 homes, later commented, "I was asked if I did it on purpose and answered that I do not recognize the Interior Ministry's right to question me about my activities in East Jerusalem, which is occupied territory and where Israeli law is not valid". Margalit, a Jerusalem City Councilor, felt that he was being singled out for political reasons stating "we're in the McCarthy era, and it will get to everyone sooner or later." In response, the Interior Ministry spokesperson said that "Mr. Meir Margalit was summoned for questioning on suspicion of building without a permit, which is a criminal act."

ICAHD sends out action alerts and activists from different groups go out and engage in civil disobedience by stopping the bulldozers. In January 2005, the group called for a campaign of Boycott, Divestment and Sanctions "until the occupation" is over. ICHAD supported the "Jewish Boat to Gaza" in 2010.

== International chapters ==
ICAHD has set up chapters in several countries. ICAHD-USA is headquartered in Chapel Hill, North Carolina, and is incorporated as a 501(c)(3) non-profit organization. The United Kingdom branch, ICAHD-UK, is located in London, and the Norwegian branch is located in Tromsø.. A German chapter is located in Bremen.

== Funding ==
In November 2012, Halper announced that ICAHD is in "financial collapse", which included "eviction from our office, due to over-dependency on a few major donors," and that they would return to solicit "grassroots" support.

According to ICAHD's website, its "activities... depend on assistance from individuals and organizations in Israel and abroad. ICAHD also receives financial support from the European Union." In 2005, the EU provided ICAHD with €472,786 for a project called "Re-framing: Providing a Coherent Paradigm of Peace to the Israeli Public" under the Partnership for Peace program.

American folk-singer Pete Seeger donated part of the royalties from his song "Turn, Turn, Turn" (To Everything There is a Season) (based on the words of King Solomon from the book of Ecclesiastes) to ICAHD.

== Reception ==
=== Support ===
In 2006, the American Friends Service Committee, a non-profit advocacy group that won the Nobel Peace Prize in 1947, nominated Jeff Halper for the Nobel Peace Prize due to his ICAHD-related work, citing ICAHD's work "to liberate both the Palestinian and the Israeli people from the yoke of structural violence" and "to build equality between their people by recognizing and celebrating their common humanity."

In 2007, ICAHD received the Olive Branch Award from Jewish Voice for Peace.

Writing in The Independent, Yasmin Alibhai-Brown described the ICAHD as "valiant, peaceful activists trying to stop bulldozers that daily demolish Palestinian homes and who tenaciously campaign against the occupation and land grabs by their own nation, their own people."

=== Criticism ===
Malcolm Hoenlein, in 2007, then executive vice chairman of the Conference of Presidents of Major American Jewish Organizations, said ICAHD was "trying to talk about demolitions without presenting the reason or truth for it. They couch it in more moderate terms but the anti-Israel purpose is clear."

In 2007, Seth Freedman wrote in The Guardian that after a day touring with ICAHD, while the visitors "had not been fed any factual inaccuracies [by ICAHD] as far as I could tell, the complete glossing over of the other side of the story should set alarm bells ringing". Freedman felt that Halper and ICAHD should have been willing to condemn wrongdoing "on both sides". Freedman changed his mind about ICAHD in 2008, and wrote in The Guardian that "the likes of Halper, ICAHD and all the others who are prepared to bring the truth into open should be praised to the skies for the invaluable work that they do." The article rues the fact that Freedman himself earlier condemned ICAHD and its work.

NGO Monitor, a right-wing pro-Israel organization, notes a number of positions taken by ICAHD that it considers objectionable. Its President, Gerald Steinberg, included ICAHD in a list of 11 "key local NGOs supporting radical pro-Palestinian (and anti-Israeli) positions".

In a July 2012 letter to the president of the European Commission, José Manuel Barroso, Steinberg wrote that ICAHD is a "fringe political NGO that fuels conflict by frequently accusing Israel of 'apartheid' and 'ethnic cleansing'. ICAHD officials are also active in promoting BDS [boycotts, divestment and sanctions] campaigns, particularly in churches in Europe and North America." Steinberg said that "In reality, ICAHD does nothing to advance coexistence and instead promotes extreme views which fuel the conflict."

== See also ==
- Israeli–Palestinian conflict

== Publications ==
- Jeff Halper, End of the Road Map, Counterpunch, January 3, 2008
- Jeff Halper, The End of a Viable Palestinian State, CounterPunch, March 31, 2005
- Jeff Halper, Nishul (Displacement): Israel's Form of Apartheid An African Conversation on Israel and Palestine, Columbia University, 2002
- Jeff Halper, The Matrix of Control, Media Monitors Network, January 29, 2001
