= Jeff Halper =

American anthropologist and activist

- ג'ף הלפר
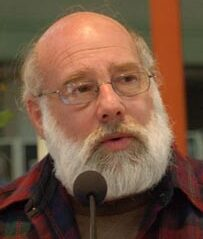
- Halper in 2008
- Born: Jeff Halper; 1946 (age 79–80); Boston, Massachusetts
- Education: Macalester College (BA); University of Wisconsin–Milwaukee (Ph.D) in Anthropology
- Occupations: Anthropologist, Director of Israeli NGO
- Known for: Co-founder and Director of Israeli Committee Against House Demolitions
- Spouse: Shoshana Halper
- Children: Efrat, Yishai, Yair
- Website: ICAHD website

Jeff Halper (Hebrew: ג'ף הלפר; born 1946) is an American-born Israeli anthropologist, author, lecturer, and political activist who has lived in Israel since 1973. He is the Director of the Israeli Committee Against House Demolitions (ICAHD) and a co-founder of The One Democratic State Campaign (ODSC).

Halper has written several books on the Israeli–Palestinian conflict and is a frequent writer and speaker about Israeli politics, focusing mainly on nonviolent strategies to solve the Israeli-Palestinian conflict. He is a supporter of the BDS movement and the academic boycott of Israel, and considers Israel to be guilty of "apartheid" and of a deliberate campaign to "judaize" the occupied Palestinian territories.

In 1997, Halper co-founded ICAHD to challenge and resist the Israeli policy of demolishing Palestinian homes in the Occupied Territories and to organize Israelis, Palestinians and international volunteers to jointly rebuild demolished Palestinian homes as political acts of resistance (ICAHD has rebuilt 189 Palestinian homes). Halper was nominated, together with the Palestinian intellectual and activist Ghassan Andoni, for the 2006 Nobel Peace Prize by the American Friends Service Committee for his work "to liberate both the Palestinian and the Israeli people from the yoke of structural violence" and "to build equality between their people by recognizing and celebrating their common humanity."

In 2013 Halper initiated, with a group of international activists, The People Yes! Network, intended to provide an "infrastructure" that will enable left and progressive groups to find each other across issues and geography, communicate, coordinate, share analyses and materials, and plan joint campaigns, especially around global issues. The ultimate goal of TPYN is to generate a conception of a just, inclusive, pluralistic and sustainable post-capitalist, "human-centric" (or "life-centric") world system and to help create the global movement that would bring it into being.

== Early career ==
Halper was born in Boston in 1946 but grew up in Hibbing, Minnesota. He received his B.A. from Macalester College and his Ph.D. in Cultural and Applied Anthropology from the University of Wisconsin–Milwaukee. During the 1960s Halper was active in the civil rights movement and the anti-Vietnam War movement, resisting military service in the war. By contrast, in a 2010 interview, Halper said: "I don't talk about it that much but I did go into the Israeli army ... I did reserve duty like everybody else for twenty some years."

Halper emigrated to Israel in 1973. In his 2008 memoir, Halper says that upon arrival in Israel "I suppose you could have called me a 'Zionist.' " Until witnessing a house demolition in 'Anata in the West Bank in 1998, Halper described himself, as "a Jew who had emigrated to Israel from the United States 25 years earlier" who "generally subscribed to what may be described as Zionist principles ..." Halper says: "I took umbrage to Mazzini's famous dictum: 'Without Country you are the bastards of Humanity.' That alone seemed enough to me to justify the existence of Israel as a Jewish state while subordinating Palestinian claims to the historical necessity of Jews to control their own destiny." Although, in his 2010 interview, Halper claimed: "I came with my eyes open. I never came [to Israel] as a Zionist."

Halper served as an adjunct lecturer in anthropology at the University of Haifa and at Ben Gurion University, though most of his academic career was spent at Friends World College (FWC). He was director of FWC's Middle East Center in Jerusalem, and when FWC merged with Long Island University in 1991, he became Director of its International Academic Operations and was promoted to the rank of associate professor.

His academic research focuses on the history of modern Jerusalem, contemporary Israeli culture, and the Middle East conflict. In addition to teaching and research, Halper is involved in issues of social justice activism in Israel. He spent ten years as a community volunteer in Jerusalem's inner city neighborhoods, and was a founder of Ohel - a social protest movement of working-class Mizrahi Jews. He served as the chairman of the Israeli Association for Ethiopian Jews, having been active in the 1960s in championing the rights of Ethiopian Jews and in researching the history of the Jewish community in Ethiopia.

== Founding of ICAHD ==
Halper co-founded the Israeli Committee Against House Demolitions (ICAHD) in 1997 to resist Israel's occupation and to work for a just peace between Israelis and Palestinians. ICAHD took as its vehicle of resistance the Israeli government's policy of demolishing Palestinian homes in the Occupied Territories (more than 47,000 since 1967, according to ICAHD), only a little more than 1% being demolished for security reasons. Many of the homes are demolished as "collateral damage" in military operations (18,000 in the 2014 attack on Gaza alone), others because Israel uses discriminatory planning and zoning policies to restrict the granting of building permits, virtually freezing Palestinian building in 1967, demolishing them when Palestinian are forced to build "illegally." The objective for this, according to Halper, is not to ensure security for Israeli citizens but simply to confine residents in the West Bank and East Jerusalem to small, impoverished, and disconnected enclaves, leaving most of the land free for Israeli settlement and annexation.

As ICAHD's Coordinating Director, Halper has organized and led direct action in opposition to Israeli policies. He has faced IDF bulldozers coming to demolish Palestinian homes, and he organizes, in the framework of ICAHD, Palestinians, Israelis and internationals to rebuild demolished Palestinian homes.

Typically, ICAHD will get a call from a Palestinian family informing it that bulldozers have arrived. ICAHD thereupon sends out an action alert, in response to which activists from different groups turn out and engage in civil disobedience by standing up to the bulldozers. ICAHD also raises funds to rebuild these homes in their original locations. In addition, under Halper's leadership, ICAHD encourages dialogue between groups in an effort to open communication, foster reconciliation and challenge stereotypes. ICAHD works in coalition with a wide range of left-wing Israeli organizations including: Rabbis for Human Rights, the Alternative Information Center and Ta'ayush, as well as Palestinian groups such as the Land Defense Committee, the Palestinian Agricultural Relief Committee (PARC) and BADIL Resource Center for Palestinian Residency and Refugee Rights.

Halper has been arrested numerous times by Israeli authorities for protesting the demolition of Palestinian homes. "As Israelis, we are privileged," he said after one arrest. "They [the police] are not going to shoot us if we resist the demolition, but if a Palestinian had done it, they would have certainly shot him."

== Activism related to Israel and Palestine ==
Halper has frequently appeared alongside Rev. Naim Ateek, the head of Sabeel, a Palestinian Liberation Theology group based in Jerusalem. "As a Jew and an Israeli," and he is also member of the support committee for the Russell Tribunal on Palestine. He has taught at universities in Israel, the US, Latin America and Africa.

Halper participated in the first Free Gaza Movement voyage in 2008 which broke the Israeli siege of Gaza. He was arrested by Israeli authorities after the trip when he tried to reenter Israel. He was one of the four Israeli citizens on the ship. He explained his reason for participating as "I cannot stand idly aside. I can no more passively witness my government’s destruction of another people than I can watch the occupation destroy the moral fabric of my own country. To do so would violate my commitment to human rights, the very essence of prophetic Jewish religion, culture and morals, without which Israel is no longer Jewish but an empty, if powerful, Sparta".

In 2007 he argued that, on the evidence of 40 years of occupation, Israel's strategy ‘is the status quo, delay, while quietly expanding the settlements,’ which in his view 'deliberately and systematically’ aims to create apartheid 'in the strict sense' of that word. Contesting Ehud Olmert’s declaration of willingness to withdraw from 100% of the occupied territories, Halper argued that, following Bush’s acceptance of settlements, which at the time effectively extended over 20% of the West Bank, would not leave Palestinians with a viable state but a series of sterile swatches of land whose borders would be controlled by Israel. By 2012 he argued that in complicity with the Palestinian National Authority, Israel appeared to be readying to annex Area C, creating a ‘viable apartheid’.

In March 2010, Halper was a keynote speaker at Israel Apartheid Week in Glasgow. Halper's lecture was entitled "Israeli Apartheid: The Case For BDS," during which he described the way that Palestinians are ‘warehoused' in Gaza.

== Views ==
Halper supports the boycott, divestment, and sanctions movement, saying in a July 2013 article that BDS has "generated meaningful pressure on governments to justly resolve the Israeli–Palestinian conflict."

In the same article he set forth five criteria for a just solution to the Israeli–Palestinian conflict:

1. A just peace and the process leading up to it must conform to human rights, international law and UN resolutions.
2. Regardless of whether there should or should not have been an Israel, two peoples now reside in Palestine-Israel and a just peace must be based on that bi-national reality.
3. A just peace requires an acceptance of the Palestinian refugees' right of return.
4. A just peace must be economically viable, with all the country's inhabitants enjoying equal access to the country's resources and economic institutions.
5. A just peace must be regional in scope – by itself Israel-Palestine is too small a unit to address all the issues at stake in the conflict—and it must address the security concerns of all in the region.

Halper supports the academic boycott against Israel.

Halper has often suggested that Israel is seeking to establish "facts on the ground," as he routinely puts it, that would render territorial concessions in any peace agreement inconceivable. Halper takes a critical view of the Israeli-Palestinian peace process. He has stated that "during the process where you're supposed to be negotiating peace" Israel, in fact, "doubled its settlement enterprise".

"The crime of apartheid," the ICAHD has said, "should be understood to mean inhumane acts committed in the context of an institutionalized regime of systematic oppression and domination by one racial group over any other racial group or groups and committed with the intention of maintaining that regime."

"The demolition of Palestinian homes and other structures, forced or resulting displacement, and land expropriation are politically and ethnically motivated," the ICAHD has declared. "The goal is to limit development and confine the four million Palestinian residents of the West Bank, East Jerusalem, and Gaza to small enclaves, thus effectively foreclosing any viable, contiguous Palestinian state and ensuring Israeli control and the 'Judaization' of the occupied West Bank and East Jerusalem." The ICAHD explains that "Judaization refers to the view that Israel has actively sought to transform the physical and demographic landscape to correspond with a vision of a united and fundamentally Jewish land under Israeli sovereignty in historic Palestine."

Halper declared in April 2012 that "a two-state solution is no longer viable." For one thing, "the facts on the ground – the settlements, the wall, the highways and the fragmentation of the territory – are all just so massive and so permanent and are constantly being expanded that there's no more place for a coherent, functional, viable, sovereign Palestinian state." For another, "there's no political will in the international community to force Israel out of the Occupied Territories." He outlines "two possible one-state solutions," one of them being "a democratic state with one person, one vote," the other being "a bi-national one-state." He also proposes a further possibility: "the idea of a Middle Eastern Economic Confederation that looks something like the European Common Market of 30 years ago" and that would include "Israel/Palestine, Jordan, Syria and Lebanon."

In September 2012, ICAHD endorsed a one-state solution. Halper explained that a two-state solution was only possible if Israel accepted Palestinian sovereignty over the Occupied Territories, Palestinian UN membership, the Palestinian right to national self-determination within the 1967 lines, and the integration of settlements on Palestinian land—which it obviously will not. In 2017 he co-founded the Palestinian-led One Democratic State Campaign (ODSC), whose 10-point program envisions an inclusive democracy between the River and the Sea, including the return of the Palestinian refugees.

== Honors and awards ==
In 2006, Halper was nominated, together with the Palestinian intellectual/activist Ghassan Andoni, for the Nobel Peace Prize by the American Friends Service Committee for his work "to liberate both the Palestinian and the Israeli people from the yoke of structural violence" and "to build equality between their people by recognizing and celebrating their common humanity."

In 2007, ICAHD received the Olive Branch Award from Jewish Voice for Peace.

== Published books ==
- Between Redemption and Revival: The Jewish Yishuv in Jerusalem in the Nineteenth Century, Westview, 1991, ISBN 978-0-8133-7855-8
- The Falashas: An Analysis of Their History, Religion and Transitional Society, University of Minnesota, 1966
- An Israeli in Palestine: Resisting Dispossession, Redeeming Israel, Pluto Press, 2008, ISBN 978-0-7453-2226-1
- Obstacles to Peace: A Reframing of the Israeli-Palestinian Conflict, ICAHD (Fourth Edition, 2009), ISBN 978-965-90626-1-4. It was published in Italian language too: Ostacoli alla pace. Una ricontestualizzazione del conflitto israelo-palestinese, Ed. Una Città, Forlì (Italy) 2009. ISBN 978-88-95919-02-7
- War Against the People: Israel, the Palestinians and Global Pacification, Pluto Press, 2015, ISBN 978-0-7453-3430-1
- Decolonizing Israel, Liberating Palestine: Zionism, Settler Colonialism, and the Case for One Democratic State, Pluto Press, 2021 ISBN 978-0-7453-4339-6

== See also ==
- House Demolitions in the West Bank
- Aqabah
- List of peace activists
