= Ivashin =

Ivashin (Russian: Ивашин) is a Russian masculine surname; its feminine counterpart is Ivashina, which is also sometimes used for males. The surname may refer to

- Andrei Ivashin (born 1999), Russian football player
- Marianna Ivashina (born 1975), Ukrainian-Dutch engineer
- Victoria Ivashina, Russian-American economist
