= Lillian Rosengarten =

Jewish-American activist

- Born: Gisela Lebrecht; May 18, 1935 (age 91); Frankfurt, Germany
- Occupations: Activist, author
- Writing career
- Years active: 2010–present
- Notable works: Survival and Conscience
- Notable awards: Palestine Book Award
- Website: www.lillianrosengarten.com

Lillian Rosengarten (née Lebrecht, born May 18, 1935) is a Jewish-American clinical social worker, activist, author, and Holocaust survivor.

Fleeing to New York City from Germany by boat in 1937, Lillian grew up in an assimilated family though began a strong connection to Israel in the 1980s through visits to her Israeli journalist cousin Hans Lebrecht. Working as a psychoanalyst and clinical social worker, Rosengarten also publishes poetry, articles about the Israeli-Palestinian conflict and family grief, and takes part in activism, such as in the boarding of a human rights boat of Jewish people bound to breach the Israeli blockade of Gaza at the age of 75, which resulted in her arrest, as well as in her speaking tour and autobiography.

== Life ==
=== Early life and introduction to Jewish activism ===
Born Gisela Lebrecht in Frankfurt, Germany on May 18, 1935, to parents Fritz and Lilli Lebrecht, Lillian's father left in 1936 to America in order to apply for a visa so he could bring Lilli and Lillian with him, a process Rosengarten later described as made complicated by both strict American immigration laws and even more strict Nazi laws on Jewish citizens leaving the country.

Residing in the Jamaica section of Queens, New York City, Rosengarten describes encountering antisemitism, including from neighbors who were overheard stating "those dirty Jews upstairs should have been killed by Hitler!”

Marrying and taking the surname Rosengarten, she describes herself as a "cultural Jew" at this point in her life, as she states her parents had identified more as Germans than as Jews and helped foster an environment where her Jewish identity did not mean much to her. She preferred activism in the realm of secular politics.

However, in her 50s, during visits to the newly created state of Israel, she describes becoming enamored by her cousin, the Israeli-Communist journalist-activist Hans Lebrecht, whose family had survived the Holocaust and the takeover of their business by the Nazis. Alleviating suffering became important to her- working as a clinical social worker and psychoanalyst, Rosengarten's exploration of the human mind of her clients, and her desire to help ease their mental suffering, led her to an appreciation of Buddhism.

=== Aid boat to Gaza ===
Rosengarten reports that she was galvanized into becoming a Jewish activist by watching the treatment of Jewish-South African Judge Richard Goldstone, a veteran jurist tapped to lead the U.N. investigation into the 2008-2009 Gaza War. The The Goldstone Report, released 15 September 2009, found human rights violations on both sides of the war, though Israel had refused to cooperate. Rosengarten describes watching with sorrow as Judge Goldstone became "demonized" by Israel, - despite Goldstone being Jewish and a supporter of Israel. Seeing that one's own Jewishness mattered in the conversation about Israel and Palestine, Lillian Rosengarten began a belated career as a Jewish activist, despite now being 74 years old.

The next year, Rosengarten joined a group of Jewish activists to deliver humanitarian aid to Gaza, which was blocked by Israel. This received coverage in The New York Times.

=== Writing and speaking career ===
By 2016, the now 81-year-old Rosengarten was going on a speaking tour to promote her autobiography, published a year earlier. Titled Survival and Conscience: From the Shadows of Nazi Germany to the Jewish Boat for Gaza, the story linked her understanding of the roots of the antisemitism she faced as a child, from both Nazi Germany and prejudiced Americans, to the roots of Israel's treatment of Palestinians.

Frequently writing for online outlets, especially the progressive Jewish publication Mondoweiss, founded by Philip Weiss (co-author of a book on the Goldstone Report), Lillian Rosengarten has used her platform to pen open letters to popular Jewish figures such as sexologist Dr. Ruth to encourage them to take a stand against the way in which Palestinians are treated under Israeli rule.

== Beliefs ==
According to her website, Lillian Rosenberg believes that "Zionism has always equated any criticism of Israel with anti-Semitism. This serves as propaganda for it relates to victimhood and puts opponents on the defensive." As a result, Rosenberg wishes to point out that Judaism can exist apart from Zionism, and works to decouple the two terms from one another.

These beliefs have led to opposing camps, according to the Jerusalem Post. On the one hand, Pax Christi International, recognized by the Vatican as a Catholic movement to spread peace and reconciliation worldwide, invited Rosenberg to speak in a museum in Germany in 2015;" on the other, prominent Jewish community members protested the talk as antisemitic for terming Israel an "apartheid state."

== Reception of Rosengarten's legacy ==
While some Israelis, such as Rami Elhanan, were encouraged to joined Lillian Rosengarten in solidarity with the idea that not all Jewish citizens support Israel's policies toward Palestinian people, others, such as the Israeli Foreign Ministry spokesman Andy David, referred to her activism as a "provocative" stunt that did not contribute anything positive toward reconciliation.

The National Catholic Reporter emphasized her status as a refugee from Nazis, as did the World Jewish Congress, one of the few bodies to contrast this with the alleged assaults on Rosengarten and other Holocaust survivors during the naval commando takeover of the ship.

The Reform Judaism publication Tikkun's editor Rabbi Michael Lerner, while disagreeing with Rosenberg's call for a blanket boycott on Israeli goods in 2014, nonetheless found her and her fellow Holocaust survivor's letter to the New York Times calling for the boycott in response to an Israeli assault on Gaza as compelling enough to reprint, given her background.

== Religion ==
Lillian Rosengarten is a Jewish Buddhist.

== Personal life ==
Lillian Rosengarten resided in Cold Spring and then Philipstown, New York, and has a daughter who is also a social worker. Lillian Rosengarten's son Philip, a musician, fell victim to drug addiction in the 1970s. Rosengarten has spoken about how, in a bid to manage this, she joined Families Anonymous to learn from those who also have an addicted family member. Shortly after checking out of a rehab in 1996, he was found unresponsive in a hotel room, with the cause of death being overdose. He was 36. This tragedy led Rosengarten to publicly speak out about the impact of addiction.
