= Efraim Benmelech =

Israeli-American financial economist

- אפרים בנמלך
- Benmelech in 2025
- Born: 1971 (age 54–55); Jerusalem, Israel
- Awards: Brattle Prize (2011)

Academic background
- Education: Hebrew University of Jerusalem (BA, MBA); University of Chicago (PhD)
- Doctoral advisor: Douglas Diamond

Academic work
- Discipline: Financial economics
- Sub-discipline: Corporate finance, credit markets, economic history
- Institutions: Kellogg School of Management, Northwestern University; Harvard University
- Notable works: Bankruptcy and the Collateral Channel (2011); The Decline of Secured Debt (2024)
- Website: effibenmelech.com

Efraim Benmelech (Hebrew: אפרים בנמלך; born 1971) is an Israeli-American financial economist. He is the Henry Bullock Professor of Finance and Real Estate at the Kellogg School of Management at Northwestern University, where he directs the Guthrie Center for Real Estate Research and the Crown Family Israel Center for Innovation, and a research associate at the National Bureau of Economic Research (NBER).

Benmelech's research concerns corporate finance and credit markets, with an emphasis on collateral and secured debt, financial contracting, credit ratings, securitization, bankruptcy and financial crises. He has also published on economic history, labor markets and automation, and the economics of terrorism. He received the Journal of Finance Brattle Group Award in 2011 for "Bankruptcy and the Collateral Channel", and the Charles River Associates Award for the best paper in corporate finance at the Western Finance Association in 2020.

== Early life and education ==
Benmelech was born in Jerusalem in 1971 and attended the Netiv Meir Bnei Akiva yeshiva high school in the city. From 1990 to 1996 he served in the Israel Defense Forces in the Paratroopers Brigade, where he was a platoon commander, chief operations officer and company commander, and was discharged with the rank of major. In 1994 he received the Chief of the General Staff's award for outstanding officers.

He earned a BA in economics and business administration from the Hebrew University of Jerusalem in 1999 and an MBA from its School of Business Administration in 2001. Between 1998 and 2001 he worked at the Israeli Ministry of Finance as assistant director of the debt management department, and in 2000–2001 he sat on the board of directors of the Israel National Coal Supplies Company.

Benmelech completed a PhD in finance at the University of Chicago Graduate School of Business in 2005 with a dissertation titled "Essays on Debt Maturity", written under the supervision of Douglas Diamond. He held a post-doctoral fellowship in organizational economics at Harvard Business School in 2004–2005.

== Academic career ==
Benmelech joined the department of economics at Harvard University as an assistant professor in 2005, was promoted to associate professor in 2009, and was the Frederick S. Danziger Associate Professor of Economics in 2011–2012.

In 2012 he moved to the Kellogg School of Management at Northwestern University as a tenured associate professor. He was named the Harold L. Stuart Professor of Finance in 2014 and the Henry Bullock Professor of Finance and Real Estate in 2021. He has directed Kellogg's Guthrie Center for Real Estate Research since 2014 and the Crown Family Israel Center for Innovation since 2022.

He was a faculty research fellow of the National Bureau of Economic Research from 2006 to 2012 and has been a research associate since 2012. He served as editor of the Review of Corporate Finance Studies from 2011 to 2018 and as an associate editor of The Journal of Finance from 2013 to 2018; since 2025 he has been an associate editor of Journal of Finance: Insights and Perspectives.

In September 2023, Israeli media reported that Benmelech had been approached by the Israeli prime minister's office as a possible successor to Amir Yaron as governor of the Bank of Israel. Benmelech confirmed that informal soundings had taken place but said he had not received a formal offer.

In November 2023 Northwestern president Michael Schill appointed Benmelech co-chair of the university's Presidential Advisory Committee on Preventing Antisemitism and Hate. In early May 2024, Benmelech and six other Jewish members of the committee resigned, stating that they had not been consulted before the university reached an agreement with participants in a pro-Palestinian encampment on campus.

== Research ==
=== Collateral and secured debt ===
Much of Benmelech's work examines how the value and redeployability of collateral shape credit contracts. In "Do Liquidation Values Affect Financial Contracts?" (2005, with Mark Garmaise and Tobias Moskowitz), he used variation in commercial zoning laws to show that higher liquidation values are associated with larger loans, longer maturities and lower interest rates. Related papers with Nittai Bergman used data on U.S. airlines and nineteenth-century American railroads to study contract renegotiation, collateral pricing and debt maturity.

"Bankruptcy and the Collateral Channel" (2011, with Bergman) argued that bankruptcies depress the collateral values of surviving industry peers and thereby tighten their access to credit, a mechanism the authors termed the collateral channel. The paper received the Journal of Finance Brattle Group Award.

With Nitish Kumar and Raghuram Rajan, Benmelech documented a long-run decline in the share of secured debt in U.S. corporate borrowing and its relationship to firm credit quality, in "The Secured Credit Premium and the Issuance of Secured Debt" (2022) and "The Decline of Secured Debt" (2024); the latter received the Charles River Associates Award for the best paper in corporate finance at the 2020 Western Finance Association meetings. He surveyed this literature in "The Benefits and Costs of Secured Debt" in the Annual Review of Financial Economics (2024).

=== Credit ratings and financial crises ===
In a series of papers published in 2009 and 2010 with Jennifer Dlugosz, Benmelech examined the ratings assigned to structured finance products before the subprime mortgage crisis. "The Alchemy of CDO Credit Ratings" and "The Credit Rating Crisis" argued that collateralized debt obligations backed by low-rated assets nonetheless received high ratings, and identified ratings inflation as a contributing factor in the crisis. A later paper with Victoria Ivashina and Dlugosz found little evidence of adverse selection in collateralized loan obligations.

Benmelech has also studied liquidity and credit freezes, including "Credit Traps" (2012, with Bergman), "The Real Effects of Liquidity During the Financial Crisis: Evidence from Automobiles" (2017), and an analysis of the Federal Reserve's Term Auction Facility.

=== Economic history and employment ===
"Financial Frictions and Employment during the Great Depression" (2019, with Carola Frydman and Dimitris Papanikolaou) linked the collapse of the U.S. corporate bond market after 1929 to firm-level employment losses, estimating that credit disruptions accounted for a substantial share of the decline in employment between 1929 and 1933. Other historical work includes studies of nineteenth-century U.S. state usury laws and of railroad debt.

=== Labor markets, real estate and technology ===
With Bergman and Hyunseob Kim, Benmelech studied the relationship between employer concentration and wages in U.S. local labor markets, finding that greater concentration is associated with lower wages. "Robots and Firm Investment" (2025, with Michal Zator) examined the adoption of industrial robots and its effects on firm investment. In real estate, "Making the House a Home" (2023, with Adam Guren and Brian Melzer) estimated the effect of home purchases on household consumption and investment.

=== Economics of terrorism and conflict ===
In work with Claude Berrebi and Esteban Klor, Benmelech has studied the characteristics of suicide bombers and the economics of counterterrorism policy. "Counter-Suicide-Terrorism: Evidence from House Demolitions" (2015) reported that punitive demolitions of the homes of perpetrators were followed by a decrease in attacks, while non-targeted demolitions of houses were followed by an increase. With Klor he also examined the determinants of the flow of foreign fighters to the Islamic State.

== Awards and honors ==
- Israel Defense Forces Chief of the General Staff award for outstanding officers, 1994
- Lehman Brothers Fellowship for Research Excellence in Finance, first prize, 2004–2005
- National Science Foundation CAREER Award, 2009–2014
- Journal of Finance Brattle Group Award, first prize, 2011
- Review of Corporate Finance Studies Best Paper Award, 2012
- Kellogg Faculty Impact Award for MBA Teaching, 2014 and 2019
- Kellogg Sidney J. Levy Teaching Award, 2019, 2021 and 2025
- Charles River Associates Award for the Best Paper in Corporate Finance, Western Finance Association, 2020
- Journal of Human Resources Highly Cited Paper Award, 2023

== Selected publications ==
- Benmelech, Efraim; Garmaise, Mark J.; Moskowitz, Tobias J. (2005). "Do Liquidation Values Affect Financial Contracts? Evidence from Commercial Loan Contracts and Zoning Regulation". The Quarterly Journal of Economics. 120 (3): 1121–1154. doi:10.1093/qje/120.3.1121.
- Benmelech, Efraim; Berrebi, Claude (2007). "Human Capital and the Productivity of Suicide Bombers". Journal of Economic Perspectives. 21 (3): 223–238. doi:10.1257/jep.21.3.223.
- Benmelech, Efraim; Bergman, Nittai K. (2008). "Liquidation Values and the Credibility of Financial Contract Renegotiation: Evidence from U.S. Airlines". The Quarterly Journal of Economics. 123 (4): 1635–1677. doi:10.1162/qjec.2008.123.4.1635.
- Benmelech, Efraim; Dlugosz, Jennifer (2009). "The Alchemy of CDO Credit Ratings" (PDF). Journal of Monetary Economics. 56 (5): 617–634. doi:10.1016/j.jmoneco.2009.04.007.
- Benmelech, Efraim; Kandel, Eugene; Veronesi, Pietro (2010). "Stock-Based Compensation and CEO (Dis)Incentives". The Quarterly Journal of Economics. 125 (4): 1769–1820. doi:10.1162/qjec.2010.125.4.1769.
- Benmelech, Efraim; Bergman, Nittai K. (2011). "Bankruptcy and the Collateral Channel". The Journal of Finance. 66 (2): 337–378. doi:10.1111/j.1540-6261.2010.01636.x.
- Benmelech, Efraim; Bergman, Nittai K. (2012). "Credit Traps". American Economic Review. 102 (6): 3004–3032. doi:10.1257/aer.102.6.3004. hdl:1721.1/87601.
- Benmelech, Efraim; Frydman, Carola (2015). "Military CEOs". Journal of Financial Economics. 117 (1): 43–59. doi:10.1016/j.jfineco.2014.04.009.
- Benmelech, Efraim; Frydman, Carola; Papanikolaou, Dimitris (2019). "Financial Frictions and Employment during the Great Depression". Journal of Financial Economics. 133 (3): 541–563. doi:10.1016/j.jfineco.2019.02.005.
- Benmelech, Efraim; Bergman, Nittai; Kim, Hyunseob (2022). "Strong Employers and Weak Employees: How Does Employer Concentration Affect Wages?". Journal of Human Resources. 57: S200–S250. doi:10.3368/jhr.monopsony.0119-10007r1.
- Benmelech, Efraim; Kumar, Nitish; Rajan, Raghuram (2024). "The Decline of Secured Debt". The Journal of Finance. 79 (1): 35–93. doi:10.1111/jofi.13308.

== Personal life ==
Benmelech lives in the Chicago area with his wife, Shikma, and their four children.
