= Marianna Ivashina =

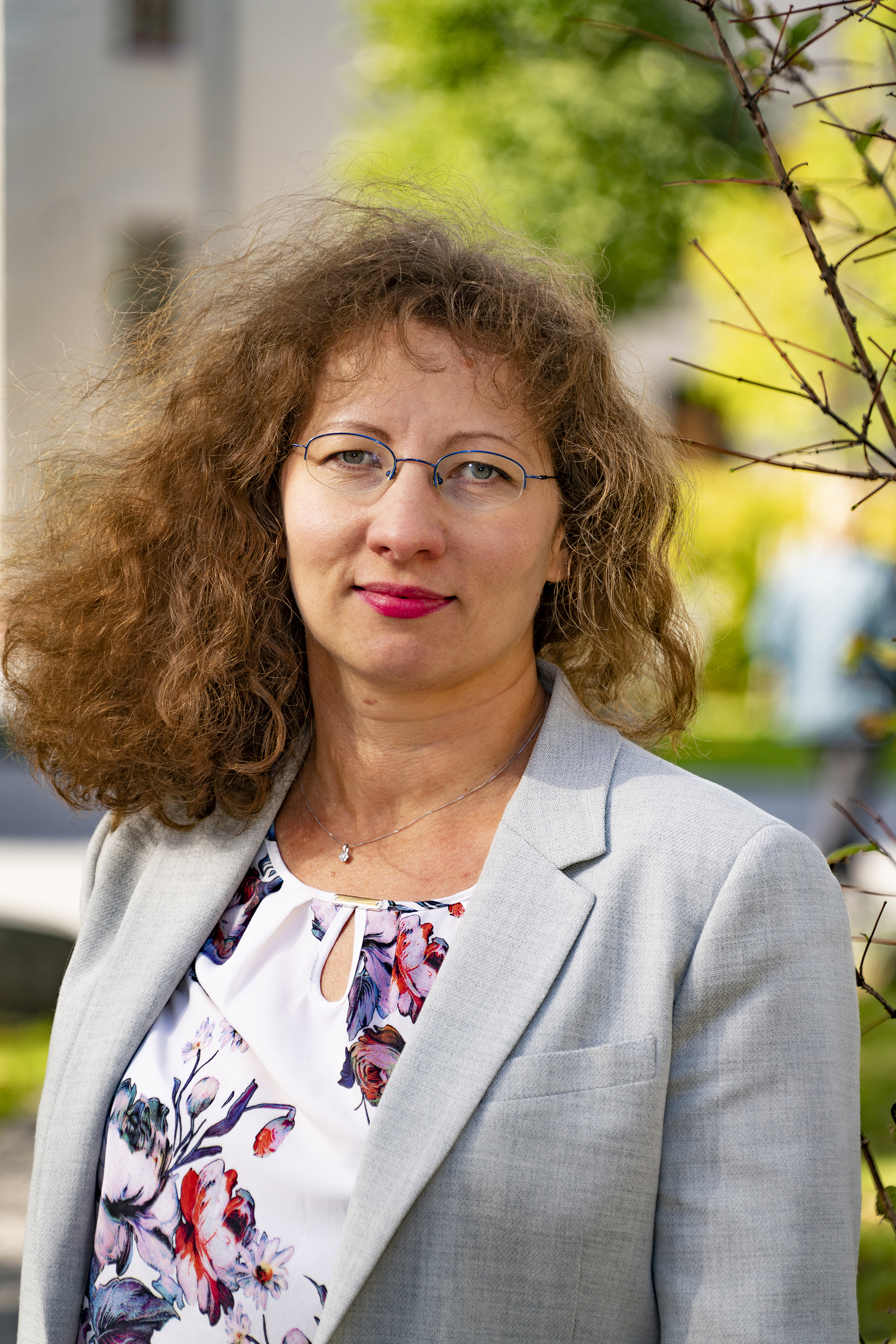
- Born: June 1, 1975 (age 51); Ukraine
- Citizenship: Sweden
- Education: Sevastopol National Technical University, Ukraine
- Scientific career
- Workplaces: Chalmers University of Technology, Gothenburg, Sweden
- Thesis: Optimization of frequency-independent antennas for satellite communication systems (2001)

Marianna Ivashina (born 1975) is a professor in Antenna Systems at Chalmers University of Technology, Gothenburg, Sweden.

== Biography ==
Marianna Ivashina received a Ph.D. in Electrical Engineering from the Sevastopol National Technical University (SNTU), Ukraine, in 2001. From 2001 to 2010 she was with The Netherlands Institute for Radio Astronomy (ASTRON), where she carried out research on innovative phased array feed (PAF) technologies for future radio telescopes, such as the Square Kilometer Array (SKA), and APERTIF PAF system for the Westerbork Synthesis Radio Telescope.

Marianna Ivashina is since 2017 Full Professor at Chalmers University of Technology, where she is head of the antenna systems research group at the Department of Electrical Engineering. Her research interests are electromagnetic design of antennas for future wireless communication and sensor systems, e.g., 5G base-stations, satellites, radars, radio telescopes, automated/cooperative systems. This includes various antenna types and technologies, such as active beamforming array antennas, MIMO antennas, high-gain reflector antennas and focal plane arrays, unconventional array architectures such as irregular, thinned and sparse arrays. An important part of her current research is integration and packaging of antennas with ICs as well as Over-The-Air (OTA) characterization of antenna systems, including system effects of signal processing and propagation.

She is an Associate Editor of the IEEE Transactions on Antennas and Propagation, and a European School of Antennas Board member

Marianna Ivashina is the vice-director of the VINNOVA Antenna Excellence Research Centre ChaseON. She is a Lead Scientist of the European Horizon2020 Innovative Training Network SILIKA ‘Silicon-based Ka-band massive MIMO antenna systems for new telecommunication services’ that is a collaboration between Chalmers University of Technology and Eindhoven University of Technology (The Netherlands), Katholieke Universiteit Leuven (Belgium), Ericsson (Sweden), NXP (The Netherlands).

== Bibliography ==
Marianna Ivashina has published about 100 peer-reviewed scientific articles in Chalmers Research database (September 2018).

"Phased Arrays for Radio Astronomy, Remote Sensing, and Satellite Communications”, K. Warnick, R. Maaskant, M. Ivashina, D. Davidson, and B. Jeffs, Cambridge University Press, 2018/7/31. ISBN 9781108539258

== Awards and prizes ==
Marianna Ivashina has received several scientific awards, including the URSI Young Scientists Award for GA URSI, Toronto, Canada (1999), APS/IEEE Travel Grant, Davos, Switzerland (2000), the 'Best team contribution' Paper Award at the ESA Antenna Workshop (2008), the International Qualification Fellowship of the European FP7 Marie Curie Actions – Swedish VINMER Program (2009), and numerous research project funding grants from national Swedish funding agencies [e.g. Swedish Agency for Innovation Systems VINNOVA, Swedish Research Council VR, Swedish National Space Board] as well as European Space Agency and European Commission (e.g. Basic Technology and Earth Observations programs, and Horizon2020 MCA program).
