= Khallit al-Dabe' =

Palestinian village in the South Hebron Hills (Masafer Yatta)

Khirbet Khallet al-Daba' خلة الضبع Khallet al-Dabe'; Khillet al-Daba'
- Hamlet
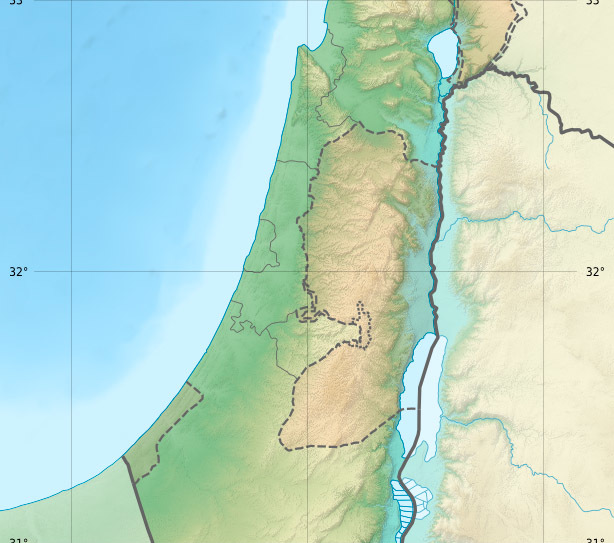
- Location within the West Bank, Palestine
- Coordinates: 31.3739°N 35.1307°E
- State: State of Palestine
- Governorate: Hebron Governorate
- Area: Masafer Yatta
- Elevation: 722 m (2,369 ft)
- Time zone: UTC+2
  - Summer (DST): UTC+3

Khallet al-Dabaʿ (also: Khallit al-Dabeʿ; Arabic: خلة الضبع) is a Palestinian herding village in the South Hebron Hills, located within the Masafer Yatta cluster of communities in the Hebron Governorate of the southern West Bank. Like the other villages of Masafer Yatta, it lies in Area C under Israeli military and civil control. Large parts of the surrounding lands have been declared Firing Zone 918, placing residents at risk of demolition, displacement, and recurrent settler-related incidents.

== History and archaeology ==
The South Hebron Hills have long been used for seasonal grazing and cave-dwelling habitation. Families in Khallet al-Dabaʿ are traditionally linked to nearby Yatta, but maintain their own hamlet identity. Archaeological surveys have noted caves, cisterns and terrace systems typical of Masafer Yatta communities.

Khalet a-Daba is a small village in Masafer Yatta built around domestic caves and herding grounds. It is among the fourteen villages identified in expert legal opinions submitted to the Israeli High Court as having long-term organic development tied to Yatta. Archaeological traces include cisterns, stone walls, and paths linking it to neighboring hamlets. Like the other villages, it is under threat of demolition following its designation as part of Firing Zone 918.

== Legal–administrative context ==
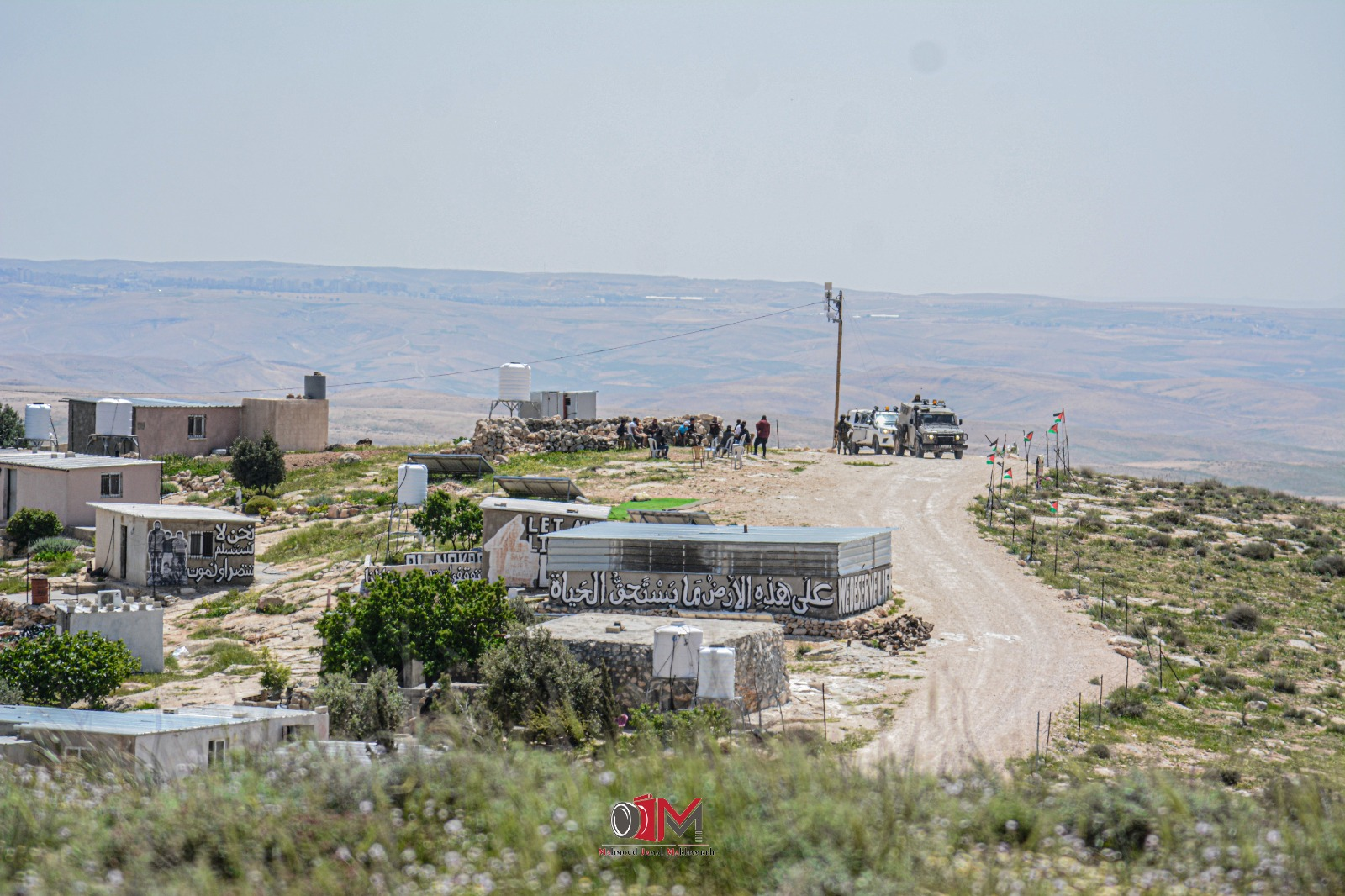
Khallit al-Dabe', Masafer Yatta

After the 1967 war, Masafer Yatta came under Israeli occupation and was classified as Area C under the Oslo Accords. In the 1980s, much of the area was designated as Firing Zone 918, restricting Palestinian construction and infrastructure. Residents face restrictions on access to water, roads, and electricity. Like other hamlets, they rely on solar panels and rain-fed cisterns, often targeted in confiscations and demolitions.

On 9 September 2022, the Supreme Court of Israel upheld demolition orders covering the entire built-up area and infrastructure of Khallet al-Dabaʿ (خلة الضبع), including homes, agricultural buildings, sheep pens, and the village school (which had previously been demolished and rebuilt). The same ruling, as reported by community advocates, set 29 September 2022 as the date on which the demolition orders would take effect. Reports at the time described 18 families—over 90 residents—as at immediate risk of displacement.

International delegations have attempted to visit Khallet al-Dabaʿ in solidarity. In January 2024, the Israeli army blocked a group of foreign diplomats and solidarity activists from entering Masafer Yatta, including Khallet al-Dabaʿ, preventing them from assessing conditions on the ground.

On 5 May 2025, Israeli forces carried out a large-scale demolition in Khallet al-Dabaʿ. According to on-the-ground reporting, the operation—lasting roughly two and a half hours—destroyed nine homes, six caves, ten water tanks, four animal barns, eleven toilet rooms, seven water wells, about 400 metres of agricultural fencing, a community centre, an electricity room, and off-grid systems including solar panels, internet equipment and security cameras. Human rights documentation further stated that “most of the homes” in the community were demolished that day, leaving 49 residents—among them 27 minors—homeless.

Following the May 2025 demolition, residents erected temporary shelters, including tents, and began salvaging materials to rebuild rudimentary housing and animal structures. Local accounts describe continued settler harassment in the weeks after the demolition, including assaults on residents and incursions into caves and orchards in the destroyed area.

On 17 June 2025, the Civil Administration's Building and Planning Bureau issued an order permitting live-fire drills in the area designated as “Firing Zone 918,” which encompasses most of Masafer Yatta's communities. Commentators noted that the order rejected municipal planning submissions and was interpreted locally as enabling the mass expulsion of residents. The order followed the early-May demolition in Khallet al-Dabaʿ; local testimony described the community's structures as having been demolished in two rounds and estimated the number of residents forced to leave at roughly 150.

== Population and livelihoods ==
Khallet al-Dabaʿ is among the smaller Masafer Yatta hamlets, with an estimated population of several dozen households. Families sustain themselves through herding of goats and sheep, dryland agriculture, and seasonal grazing. The community relies on tanked water supply and off-grid energy. Livelihoods are highly vulnerable due to demolitions, restricted mobility, and settler harassment.

== Settler violence and government-sponsored attacks ==
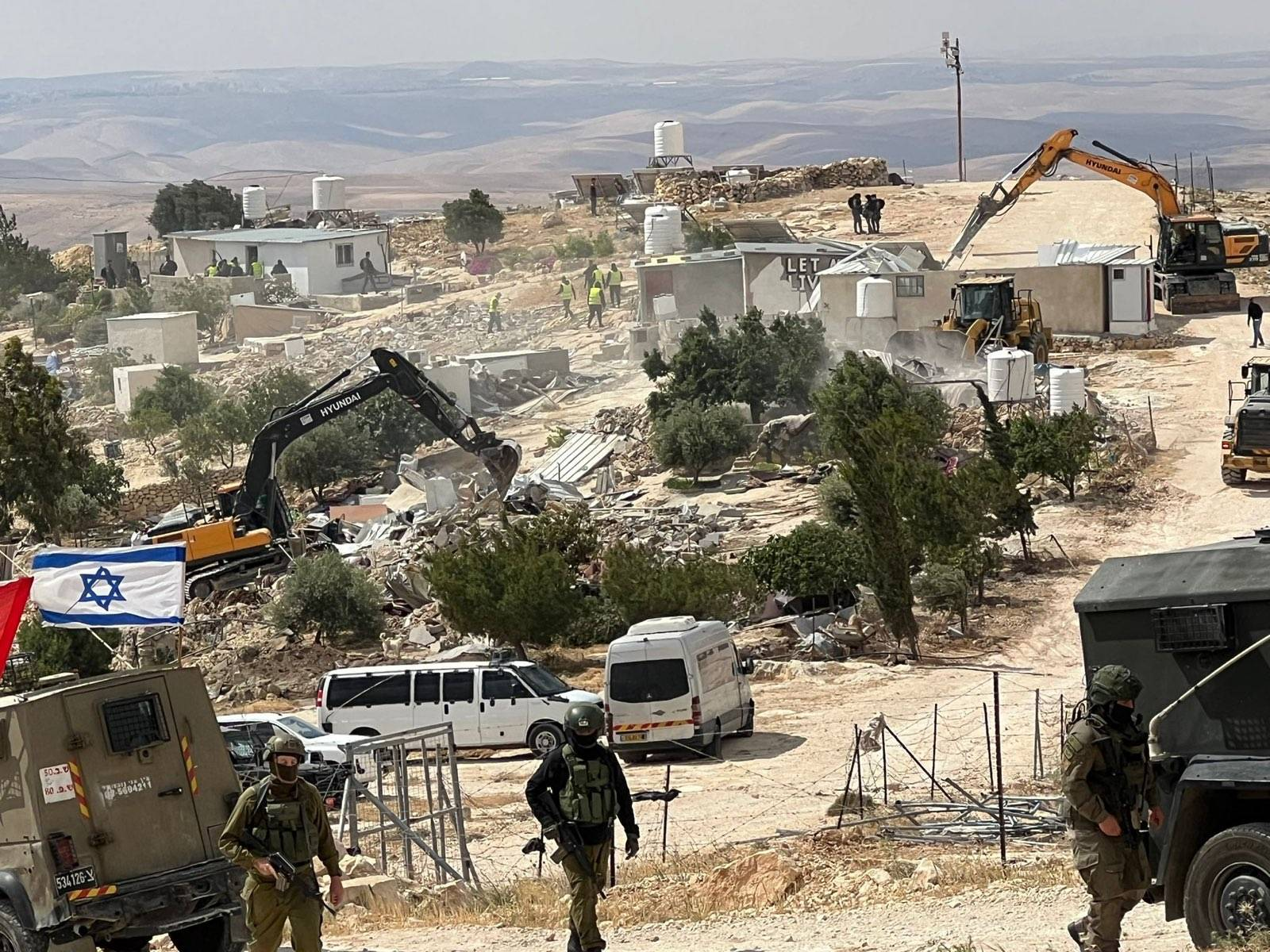
On May 5, 2025, the Israeli army destroyed several houses and cave dwellings in Khallet Al-Dabaa, in the occupied West Bank. In total, 21 Palestinian children and 28 Palestinian adults were forcibly displaced.

On multiple occasions, settlers have targeted crops and orchards belonging to Khallet al-Dabaʿ residents. In September 2023, the Land Research Center reported that colonists destroyed dozens of olive trees and damaged fields belonging to the hamlet's farmers.

On 25 July 2018, the Israeli army demolished several homes and water cisterns in Khallet al-Dabaʿ, displacing 20 people, including children.

The hamlet's school has been subject to repeated demolition and confiscation. In July 2020, Israeli forces dismantled and confiscated a donor-funded school structure serving Khallet al-Dabaʿ children, forcing students to study outdoors or in temporary shelters.

In March 2021, Israeli forces demolished four houses in al-Mufqara and Khallet al-Dabaʿ, displacing several families. The demolitions were part of a broader pattern targeting communities across Masafer Yatta.

On 11 August 2021, Israeli bulldozers demolished a rain-water cistern belonging to a resident of Khallet al-Dabaʿ, along with other structures in the eastern Yatta area. The same operation also razed, for a second time, an agricultural shack in nearby al-Fakhit, and demolished an agricultural room and a 100-m^{2} house belonging to Muhammad Dababseh, displacing a family of more than twelve people.

Khallet al-Dabaʿ and its pasturelands have experienced repeated settler incursions and attacks. On 28 March 2022, settlers arrived at grazing land west of the community and drove out a local resident, ‘Ali al-Jabarin (60), from the area he was tending. In another incident documented by B’Tselem, settlers pepper-sprayed a Palestinian shepherd in the face and struck him on the head with a club in the vicinity of the hamlet.

In November 2023, settlers armed with clubs and firearms launched an attack near Khallet al-Dabaʿ and surrounding hamlets, injuring several Palestinians. Independent media reported injuries from live fire and beatings, including cases requiring hospitalization.

In December 2023, eyewitnesses documented settlers accompanied by soldiers raiding Khallet al-Dabaʿ, abducting a resident, smashing solar panels, and seizing personal property and livestock. On 23 December 2023, three Palestinians were also detained during an Israeli military raid in the hamlet amid a settler attack on the area.

Reports in May 2025 following the mass demolition noted that residents vowed to remain in the hamlet despite the destruction, setting up makeshift shelters among the ruins. International media coverage highlighted the resilience of families determined to resist displacement.

On 2 June 2025, Al Jazeera reported on the resilience of Khallet al-Dabeʿ’s residents following repeated demolitions and settler violence. The article described how Israeli forces demolished around 25 residential and agricultural structures in May 2025, after which settlers attempted to seize a cave belonging to the al-Dababsa family and turn it into an outpost. The report also noted that settlers set fire to one of the village’s homes, further displacing residents. Although Israeli courts eventually ordered the evacuation of the settlers from the cave, the community remained under constant threat.

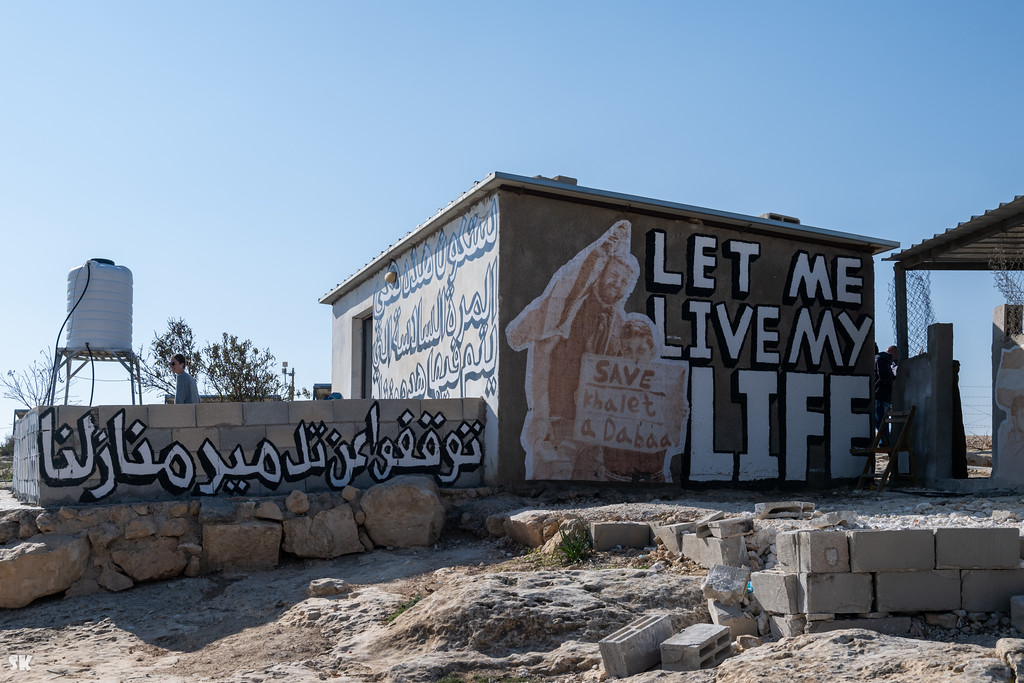
Inscription on a house in Masafer Yatta, a village in Palestine, threatened with destruction by the Israeli occupation, January 2023

The same house was destroyed in June 2025 by Israeli bulldozers.

=== September 2025 pogrom and demolitions ===
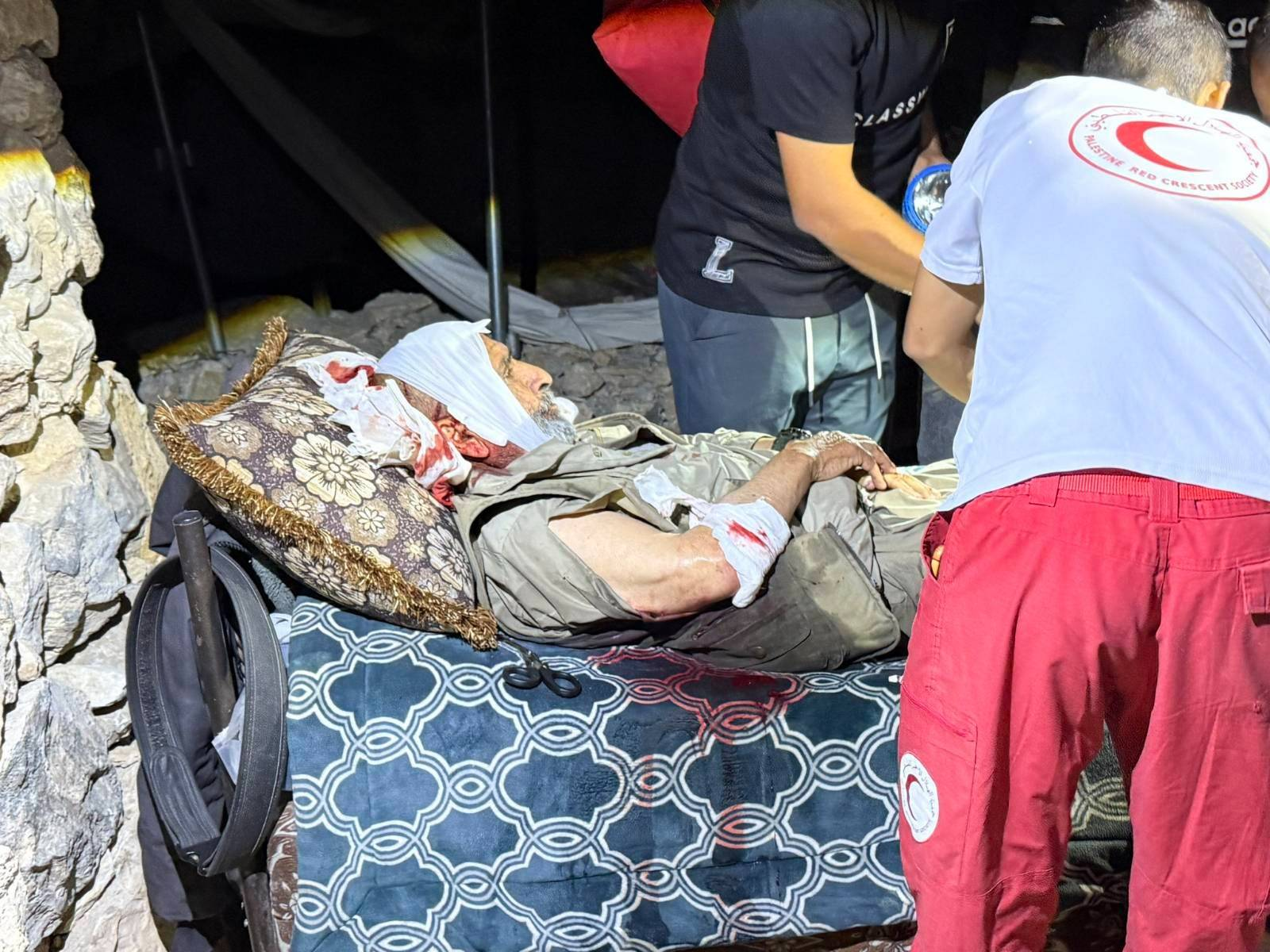
Elderly Palestinian man injured by Israeli settlers

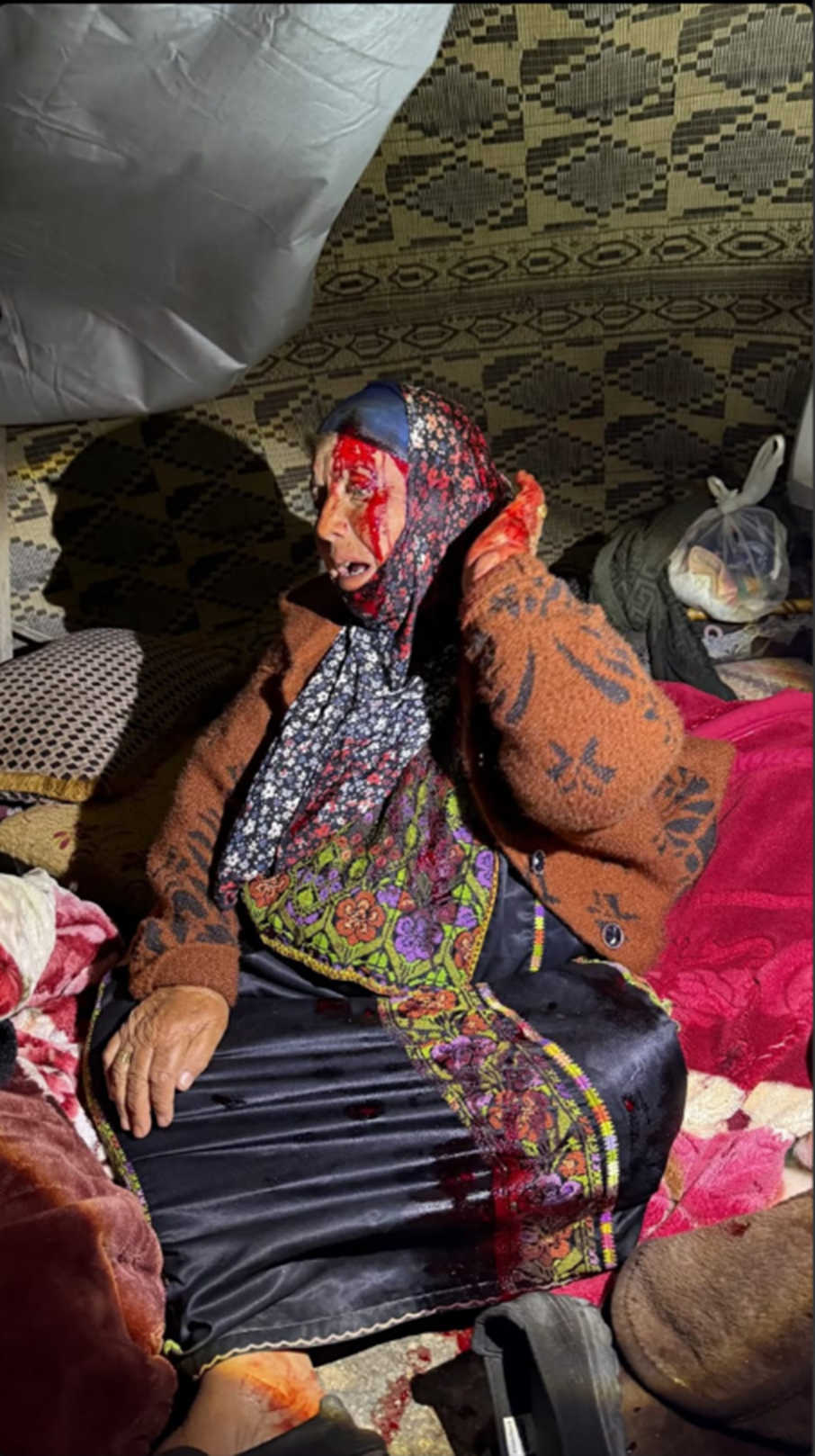
An elderly Palestinian victim of the September 2025 Khallit al-Dabe' pogrom; settler violence receives encouragement and support from the Israeli government

On 5 September 2025, Israeli settlers carried out a large-scale pogrom on Khallit al-Dabeʿ. According to multiple reports, dozens of settlers entered the village at dawn armed with sticks and knives, assaulting residents with beatings, stabbings, and tear gas. At least twenty Palestinians were injured, including seven children and a three-month-old infant, as well as elderly residents over the age of eighty. Nine of the injured were transferred to hospital with fractures, contusions, and other serious wounds. Homes and agricultural property, including olive, grape, and almond trees, were destroyed, while livestock fodder was looted. Israeli authorities temporarily detained several victims, and three members of the al-Dababsa family were arrested. Local sources reported that some families who lost their houses were forced to take shelter in nearby caves. The attack was described by Palestinian media as part of a systematic effort to expel the inhabitants of Masafer Yatta, in the context of Israeli court rulings ordering the demolition of the village and government policies supporting settler activity in the area.

Two weeks following the pogrom, while many residents remained incapacitated and in critical condition in the hospitals, Israeli forces launched a large-scale demolition operation in Khirbet Khillet al-Dibʿ. Instead of protecting the civilian population from settler attacks, Military units entered the village with bulldozers and heavy machinery, accompanied by soldiers who cordoned the area. The troops preceded demolish what remained of the community’s dwellings and infrastructure. Reports documented the destruction of houses, tents, caves adapted as shelters, water cisterns, solar power units, and sanitation facilities, leaving dozens of residents without habitable structures or access to basic services.

The demolitions were described in Palestinian and regional media as amounting to the “complete eradication” of the hamlet, in preparation for the construction of new settlements in the so-called "Firing Zone". Local leaders reported that the campaign dismantled not only residential shelters but also agricultural facilities and service networks essential to the community’s survival. The operation was accompanied by tightened movement restrictions in the area, including the installation of roadblocks and iron gates on access routes inline with the expanded Hafrada regime.

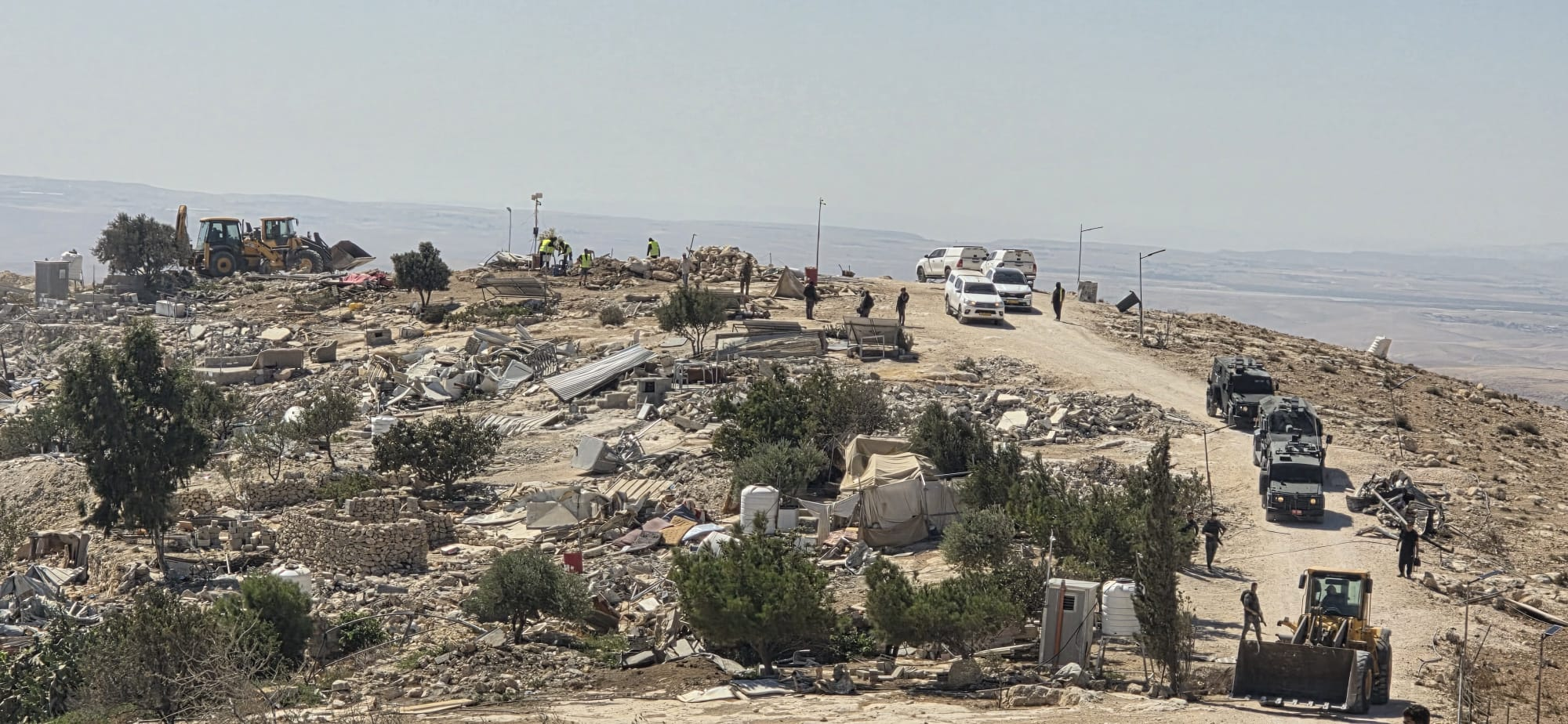
Israeli demolition of the village following the September pogrom

== See also ==
- Masafer Yatta
- South Hebron Hills
- Firing Zone 918
- Israeli–Palestinian conflict
- Israeli settler violence
