= Aqabah =

Al Aqabah
- Local Development Committee

Arabic transcription(s)
  - Arabic: العقبة
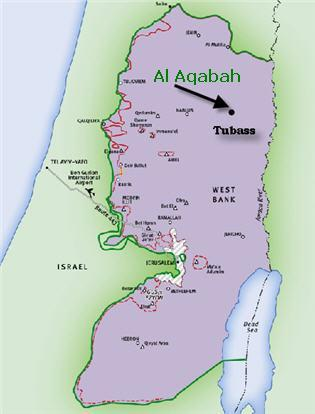
- Aqabah in Area C of West Bank, under Israeli control.

- Location of Al Aqabah within Palestine
- Coordinates: 32°20′15.90″N 35°25′00.40″E
- State: State of Palestine
- Governorate: Tubas

Government
  - Type: Local Development Committee
  - Head of Municipality: Haj Sami Sadeq

Area
  - Total: 3,500 dunams (3.5 km^{2}; 1.4 sq mi)

Population (2017)
  - Total: 168
  - Density: 48/km^{2} (120/sq mi)

Aqabah (Arabic: العقبة, and also called Al Aqabah, Aqaba, or Al Aqaba) is a Palestinian village in the northeastern West Bank, which is being targeted for demolition by the Israeli Civil Administration (the IDF agency responsible for controlling the West Bank) as the majority of structures were alleged to have been built without permits from the Israeli military administration. Surrounded by two Israeli military bases and a ‘virtual wall’ of checkpoints, Al-Aqaba's connections to neighboring communities, markets and the Jordan Valley have been gradually severed: since 1967, al-Aqaba's population has decreased by 85%, dropping from around 2,000 to less than 200 today. While many al-Aqaba residents no longer live in the village itself, they still hope to return to their land, and still send their children to the local school.

Located in Area C of the West Bank on the edge of the Jordan Valley, the village is under complete Israeli military control and civil jurisdiction.

The Israeli Civil Administration has so far issued 39 Demolition Orders against the houses and structures of the village, including the medical center, an internationally funded kindergarten, the houses, and the village mosque.

A petition to the Israeli Supreme Court asking the court to cancel the demolition orders on the basis of an existing land-use plan was rejected on April 17, 2008.

The villagers, led by Mayor Haj Sami Sadeq, have initiated a local and international campaign, in cooperation with several Israeli and American human rights organizations, to save the village. The campaign has included taking Israelis and foreign diplomats to visit Aqabah, lobbying the Quartet and asking for its intervention, and conducting a US speaking tour with the participation of Mayor Sadeq and prominent Israeli architect Shmuel Groag.

The goal of the campaign is to encourage the Israeli authorities to authorize the land-use plans and allow the village to stand.

== History ==
=== Byzantine period ===
Aqabah is mentioned in the 6th-7th century Mosaic of Reḥob inscription under the name ’Iqabin (איקבין), being a place inhabited mostly by non-Jews and, therefore, agricultural produce obtained from the area could be taken by Jews without the normal restrictions imposed during the Sabbatical years, or the need for tithing.

=== Israeli occupation (1967- ) ===
After the 1967 Six-Day War, for 36 years, Aqabah was the site of an Israeli military camp, and the area was declared as closed military zone, with only 4 pre-1967 stone houses regarded by the occupying power as 'legal'. Another 70 houses built since without Israeli permits, which cannot be obtained in areas defined as military zones, are up for demolition. The IDF conducted live training exercises inside the village, causing the death of 8 villagers and wounding more than 50 residents.

Haj Sami Sadeq, Mayor of Aqabah, is one of the victims of those live training exercises, paralyzed for life after being shot by three bullets while working in his fields as a 16 year old.

In addition, according to the UN Office for the Coordination of Humanitarian Affairs, the Israeli military also expropriated large areas of privately registered land.

On June 27, 2001, Aqabah won a legal battle in the Israeli High Court of Justice (HCJ) when the HCJ recommended the army remove its military camp from the village's lands and find an alternate site.

Two years later, the Israeli military complied with the court's order, and in June 2003 the military camp was finally removed from the village. Israel has refused to connect the village to a water grid, and supplies have to be purchased and trucked in. After his house was bulldozed in August 2015, Rashid Dabak commented, "The problem with Israelis is that they suffer from a weak sense of humanism."

== Foreign investment and help ==
Villagers rely primarily on agriculture and grazing for their livelihoods, with a combined livestock herd of around 800 animals. Recognizing that the residents of Aqabah own clear title to approximately 3,500 dunams of registered (Tabo) land, Israel's allies, the United Nations, and several international organizations have invested heavily in the village: USAID helped build the road, the British government built the medical clinic, and the Japanese Embassy provided funds for a water tank.

In 2004, the American nonprofit organization, The Rebuilding Alliance, initiated the building of a large, modern kindergarten and lower-grade school. Aqabah was chosen as the site for the kindergarten because the town's High Court victory against the IDF seemed to guarantee that the town was legally recognized by the Israeli government and would not be demolished.

In a joint project, the Japanese Embassy, the Belgian Embassy and the Norwegian Embassy helped add a second story to the kindergarten.

Being the only kindergarten in the whole area, the Aqabah kindergarten today serves more than 130 kindergarteners and 70 elementary school children in the region.

The UN Development Programme, CARE International, the Danish Embassy, and the Dutch have also invested resources in building and maintaining structures in the village.

== Threats and Acts of Demolition ==
Located in Area C of the West Bank, Aqabah is subject to the Israeli Civil Administration's zoning authority and regulations.

In 1998, the Village Council applied to the Israeli Civil Administration for a master plan which would enable the village to obtain permits for construction, but the Civil Administration has never replied to their request. As a result, Aqabah was left with no zoning plan except for the one made by the British in 1945, more than sixty years ago.

The left-wing Israeli organization Gush Shalom states that despite the population increase and changing needs of the village inhabitants, the Civil Administration ignored their needs and turned them into "lawbreakers" against their will.

According to Mayor Sadeq, 600 residents were forced to leave the village due to the Israeli expansion and annexation policies, and only 300 residents remain.

In 2003, the Israeli Civil Administration began issuing demolition orders against the village structures, claiming "lack of building permits" and ignoring the repeated attempts of the village at getting a land-use plan authorized.

Bulldozers sent by the Civil Administration arrived at the village and destroyed two homes. After the intervention of the American Consulate, the demolitions were halted. However, the Civil Administration continued issuing Demolition Orders to further its plan of demolishing the village and converting it into a "closed military area."

Mayor Sadeq and Gush Shalom argue that Israel's plan aims to annex 805 more dunams of the village's lands and reshape the village in accordance with the Civil Administration's plan. According to this plan, the army intends to demolish all of the houses that will be out of the village's new border, and to move these families to the new boundaries of the village after it loses most of it lands.

If the Civil Administration's plan is fully implemented and the army demolishes most of the houses, only six houses will remain inside the new border, and for all practical purposes, the village will be destroyed.

As of December 2008, 39 of the village structures - virtually the entire village - face demolition orders.

=== High Court petition denied ===
The village, with the help of Rebuilding Alliance, hired an Israeli attorney to petition the Israeli Supreme Court for a lifting of the Demolition Orders and for initiating a land-use plan that will answer the population's needs.

The petition was filed in January 2004, and the court issued a Temporary Restraining Order staying further demolitions pending the outcome of the case.

On April 17, 2008, after four years of negotiations, the Supreme Court - sitting as a High Court of Justice (HCJ) - finally heard the case. None of the village residents was allowed to attend the hearing in the Supreme Court in Jerusalem.

In oral argument, Adv. Tusya-Cohen stated that it was the state's duty to set up a team of experts, to draw up an up-to-date Master Plan, according to which building permits could have been issued - not to stick to a completely obsolete plan, decades out of date and completely unfitting the conditions on the ground, making his clients into "law-breakers" against their will.

On the same day of the hearing, the HCJ issued a 1-page decision denying the petitions and authorizing the demolitions of all the structures. Judges Edmond Levy, Miriam Naor and Yoram Danziger wrote:

As for the demolition orders themselves – Petitioners have no real cause for granting an order and receiving a remedy. Even if the planning authorities committed negligence by omission, and we do not say so, this does not give permission for chaotic building and setting facts on the ground that may become obstacles for any future planning. Moreover, cancelling the demolition orders – as the Petitioners request – would be tantamount to the Court authorizing the [building] offenses, and it is obvious that Petitioners cannot win such a remedy.

The judges concluded by authorizing the demolition of the entire village. They added, however, that they are "acknowledging" the Civil Administration's proposal that would leave several public buildings standing but demolish most of the homes in the village.

=== Response to High Court decision ===
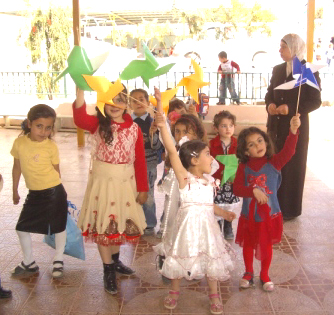
Children of kindergarten slated for demolition holding "pinwheels for peace."

The residents of Aqabah, Mayor Haj Sami Sadeq and Israeli and American human rights organizations are determined to continue to fight to save the village.

In a letter of protest to Israeli Defense Minister Ehud Barak, Gush Shalom, the Israeli Peace Bloc, wrote:

Those who sign such a barbaric order and send soldiers to terrorize children in a small, quiet village where few hundred families live, prove the nullity of the governmental peace speeches and solemn conferences."

The Rebuilding Alliance and Gush Shalom state that the Supreme Court's decision is seriously flawed because it is based on grave misrepresentations and omission of facts. As documents from the UN Office for the Coordination of Humanitarian Affairs prove, in 1998 the Village Council filed a master plan.

Thus, the assertion that there is no master plan is factually wrong. Had the Civil Administration authorized it or addressed it in any manner, the villagers would have been able to obtain permits for construction. In addition, in 2006 the village commissioned another comprehensive land-use plan which was drawn by architect Jamal Juma but the Israeli Civil Administration ignored the plan.

In its decision, the Israeli High Court of Justice ignored the existence of these plans, falsely portraying the villagers as "law-breakers" and "chaotic builders" who have no respect for rule of law.

Moreover, in April 2008, the Israeli-NGO BIMKOM (Israeli Planners for Planning Rights) reviewed the village's zoning plan to insure its conformity to Israeli standards. Architect Shmuel Groag, co-founder of BIMKOM and an expert in town planning, reviewed and edited the plan and recommended that it be authorized. In September 2008, while appearing before Congressmen on Capitol Hill, Mr. Groag stated:

Al Aqabah village has clear title to its land, knows its own needs, and should have the same right to be recognized and have a master plan like any other town in the modern world. Yet the Israeli Army routinely denies building permits for Palestinians in Area C without regard to Palestinian needs - while Jewish settlements are expanding in Area C without regard to international law.

Rebuilding Alliance founder Donna Baranski-Walker issued a press release noting that the village has never posed any security problem, and there is no justification for demolishing the houses. The demolition orders should be stayed until BIMKOM's land-use plan is authorized.

This course of action follows a precedent that was set in the case of the Palestinian village Wallaje in southern Jerusalem which was also saved pending the authorization of a land-use plan. The families of Aqabah, the Mayor, BIMKOM and Gush Shalom have called for the implementation of a similar plan in the case of Aqabah, and urged the Israeli authorities to avoid the destruction of the village.

== Demography ==
=== Local origins ===
Residents of 'Aqabah originated from Egypt, Ar'ara, and the area of Nablus.

== See also ==
- House demolition in the Israeli-Palestinian conflict
- Sumud
- Oslo Accords
