= Jewish Boat to Gaza =

2010 humanitarian aid convoy from Cyprus to Gaza

The Jewish Boat to Gaza was an initiative in an attempt to break the blockade of Gaza in late 2010 organized by Jews for Justice for Palestinians, a pro-Palestinian group based in London. The boat, a catamaran named the MV Irene, had eight activists on board, all of them either Israelis or Jews, including Holocaust survivors, from the United States, United Kingdom, or Germany, as well as two journalists, a total of ten passengers. It received support by the Israeli Committee Against House Demolitions (ICAHD) as well as British actor Stephen Fry and Polish-born British activist Marion Kozak. The boat set sail from Northern Cyprus on September 26, 2010.

== Interception by Israel ==
The boat was stopped by the Israeli Navy on September 28, 2010, after being warned to change course. The Irene had approached within 20 miles of the coast, and was confronted by at least 10 Israeli warships and boarded from speedboats by Shayetet 13 naval commandos. According to the activists, Israeli forces opened fire at them as soon as they landed on the vessel. One of the activists, Vish Vishvanath, stated that its crew were "almost strip searched" and took down the Union Jack as soon as Israeli authorities boarded the yacht. The IDF later issued a statement that the vessel was boarded without incident and that "no violence of any kind was used by neither the passengers onboard nor the Israel naval forces."

The vessel and activists were taken to Ashdod port, where foreign activists were handed over to members of the Interior Ministry's Oz Unit, while the Israelis were taken to the Ashdod police station for questioning. A group of 20 Israelis staged a protest near Ashdod port. Activists and family members followed the Israeli passengers as they were taken in for police interrogation and protested. All of the activists were later deported and released without charge.

=== Allegations of mistreatment ===
One of the activists, Yonatan Shapira, an Israeli activist and former pilot of the Israeli Air Force, said on Democracy Now!, that he was brutally beaten and shocked with a taser gun, stating, "The soldiers were very brutal to us. They didn’t kill us like they kill the other Palestinians and Muslims, but they were very brutal. I got shot with a taser shock gun, electric, and was brutally treated, just like my brother Itamar."

== See also ==
- Blockade of the Gaza Strip
- Gaza Freedom Flotilla
- Global Sumud Flotilla
