= Victoria Ivashina =

Russian-American economist

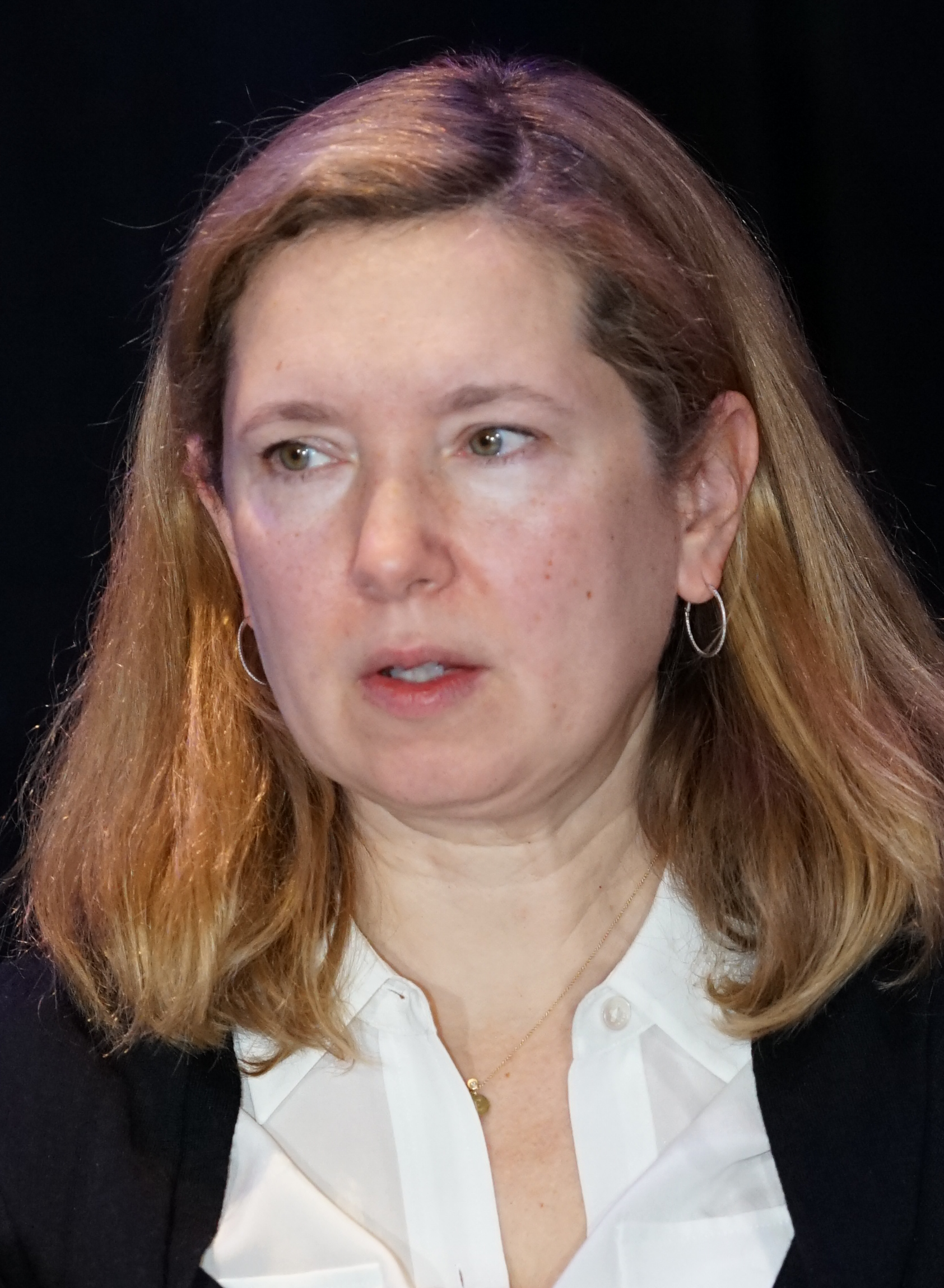
Ivashina at ASSA 2026

Victoria Ivashina (/e-'va-she-na/) is a Russian-American economist and Lovett-Learned Professor of Finance at Harvard Business School, where she has taught since 2006. She is a research associate at the National Bureau of Economic Research (NBER) and a research fellow at the Center for Economic Policy Research (CEPR).

== Early life and education ==
Ivashina was born in Kazakhstan, and was raised in Russia. She moved often within Russia, and attended six high schools. Ivashina pursued university studies in Peru, where her parents were working, and learned Spanish while completing her bachelor's degree. Ivashina holds a B.A. in economics from the Pontifical Catholic University of Peru and obtained a Ph.D. in finance from the NYU Stern School of Business.

== Career ==
Ivashina has taught at Harvard Business School since 2006, where she is Lovett-Learned Professor of Finance. She is a research associate at the National Bureau of Economic Research (NBER) and a research fellow at the Center for Economic Policy Research (CEPR).

== Key publications ==
Gompers, Paul A., Victoria Ivashina, and Richard S. Ruback. Private Equity: A Casebook. London: Anthem Press, 2019.

Ivashina, Victoria, and Josh Lerner. Patient Capital: The Challenges and Promises of Long-Term Investing. First ed. Princeton, NJ: Princeton University Press, 2019.
