= The Rebuilding Alliance =

Non-profit organization

Rebuilding Alliance
- Founded: 2003
- Purpose: Rebuilding Alliance is dedicated to advancing equal rights for the Palestinian people through education, advocacy, and support that assures Palestinian families the right to a home, schooling, economic security, safety, and a promising future.
- Headquarters: Redwood City, California; United States
- Members: 20,000+
- Key people: Donna Baranski-Walker (founder); Dr. Beverly Voloshin
- Website: www.rebuildingalliance.org

Rebuilding Alliance (RA) is a non-profit organization based in Redwood City, California, founded by electrical engineer Donna Baranski-Walker in 2003, that rebuilds homes and communities in regions of war and occupation. It developed from the Global Campaign to rebuild Palestinian Homes Organization, which had been dissolved a year earlier.

== Organization ==
Baranski-Walker who also holds an M.S. in Agricultural Engineering from the University of Hawaiʻi, worked as an inventions licensing associate at M.I.T., Stanford and SRI International. Her activist work has been recognized by Solidarity, who presented her with a Medal of Gratitude, and two certificates of Special Congressional Recognition. In 2003 she was awarded the Lewis Mumford Award for Development by the Architects, Designers, and Planners for Social Responsibility.

RA advocates for government policies towards regions of conflict based on human rights and international law. Through a mutual commitment to justice, RA has created alliances among supporters, partners, and those who suffer injustice and violence, yet resist through rebuilding. RA projects are symbols of hope that help rebuild shattered communities and offer people around the world immediate ways to make peace, starting with the tangible support of a family's right to a home.

In the Palestinian territories, the group has had two foci of activity: Area C, 60% of the West Bank where 150,000 Palestinians live, and where, the organization states, Israel does not permit Palestinians to build on their own land, by refusing building licenses. Secondly they support the Rachel Corrie Rebuilding Campaign in Gaza, where over 30,000 Palestinians in Gaza made homeless after 2000, Rebuilding Alliance partnered with the Gaza Community Mental Health Programme to rebuild homes, schools, and communities. The starting point was the rebuilding of the Nasrallah family home that was the site of Rachel Corrie's death, and which was demolished later. The house was rebuilt in 2007.

The non-governmental organization (NGO) played a role in lobbying the US Senate to intervene and stop the demolition of the Jordan Valley Palestinian village of Aqabah, where it had built a three-storey kindergarten.

During the on-going Israel-Palestinian conflict, the non-profit won a contract by the World Food Programme and as a result continues to feed 80,000 Palestinian civilians every day across Gaza through its hot meals program. The non-profit works closely with United Nations Relief and Works Agency in supplementing its efforts to provide for shortfalls of cleaning supplies and food in UN schools or Designated Emergency Shelters. The non-profit, along with other pro-Palestinian advocacy groups, led a congressional letter addressed to Prime Minister Benjamin Netanyahu, urging his government “to intervene on behalf of the Sumarin family and halt their eviction from their long-standing home."

After the 7 October attack, the non-profit also ended a bipartisan delegation of US lawmakers to the West Bank providing Members of Congress a chance to witness first-hand the realities of the Palestinian people on-ground and as a result, has been widely regarded as influential in shaping American foreign policy in the West Bank. Most recently, the non-profit was successful in leading a congressional letter to Secretary of State Antony Blinken calling for a medical truce in Gaza to combat the rise in polio.

Currently, the non-governmental organization is governed by a five-member Board of Directors.
