= Meir Margalit =

Israeli human and civil rights activist

- מאיר מרגלית
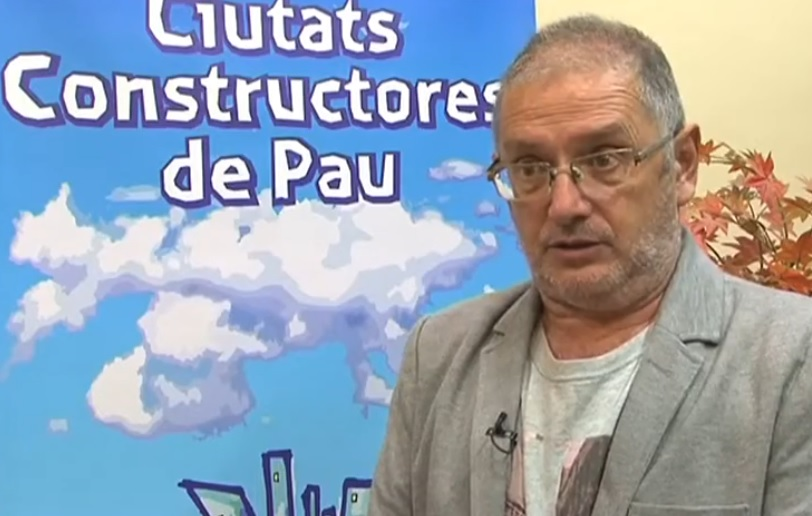

Jerusalem City Council member
- In office 1998–2002
- In office 2008–?

Personal details
- Born: 1952 (age 73–74) Argentina
- Party: Meretz
- Education: Haifa University
- Occupation: Human and Civil Rights Activist
- Known for: Founder of Israeli Committee Against Housing Demolitions, Researcher of the history of the Jewish community during the period of Mandatory Palestine and a frequent speaker and lecturer.

Meir Margalit (Hebrew: מאיר מרגלית; born 1952) is a human and civil rights activist in Jerusalem. He received a Ph.D. in history from Haifa University. Dr. Margalit is a researcher of the history of the Jewish community during the period of Mandatory Palestine, specializing in the early peace and bi-national movements within the population prior to the U.N. mandated partition of Palestine in 1947, and the subsequent creation of the State of Israel in 1948. Dr. Margalit is a co-founder of the Israeli Committee Against Housing Demolitions, and CAPI, The Committee for the Advancement of Peace Initiatives.

== Biography ==
Meir Margalit was born in Argentina and moved to Israel in 1972. During his military service he served in a Jewish settlement in Gaza Strip. He was injured in the Yom Kippur War of 1973. During his recovery he began to gradually adopt a radical progressive and pacifist position.

He was an elected member of the Jerusalem City Council, representing the Left-Wing Meretz Party between 1998 and 2002. Elected again for Meretz in 2008, he has been a member of the city council, officially in charge of the East Jerusalem portfolio until 2011. He is known for his staunch criticism of the various Jerusalem mayors for their policies of perceived and realized discrimination towards the Palestinian residents of the city.

Margalit is the author of several books on municipal policy, Israeli sociology, and contemporary Israeli history, and a frequent speaker and lecturer in many countries around the world. Among his most recent and notable books are: El Eclipse de la Sociedad Israeli (Madrid, Catarata, 2024) El Delirio de Israel (Madrid, Catarata, 2025), Forgotten, Suppressed, Denied. The Forging of Israel's National Memory (Berlin, De Gruyter)
