= Philip Munger =

American composer, educator, blogger (born 1946)

- Born: November 3, 1946 (age 79)
- Employer: University of Alaska Anchorage
- Known for: Composer, music educator, political blogger, environmentalist

Philip Munger (born November 3, 1946) is an American composer, music educator, political blogger, and environmentalist living in Alaska. He is perhaps best known for "The Skies are Weeping", a seven-movement cantata written in tribute to Rachel Corrie, an American member of the International Solidarity Movement killed in 2003 by a bulldozer operated by the Israel Defense Forces while she tried to prevent a house demolition in the southern Gaza Strip during the Second Intifada. He currently lectures on cultural history at two campuses of the University of Alaska Anchorage and occasionally teaches tuba at the main Anchorage campus. He was born in 1946 and attended Oberlin Conservatory and the University of Washington, where he studied musical composition.

== Life ==
Philip Munger was born in 1946 and attended Oberlin Conservatory and the University of Washington, where he studied musical composition. Since moving to Alaska from Seattle in 1973, leaving behind a lucrative career in frequency modulated radio, teaching dogs to roof-climb, and serving as understudy to Burt Lancaster in The Rainmaker, he has worked as a commercial fisherman, was a blue water mariner for several years, and worked for almost thirteen years in the various systems of the justice field. He helped to expand the Whittier Boat Harbor, started the Prince William Aquaculture Corporation, and helped start of first volunteered search-and-rescue unit on Prince William Sound. He directed the largest halfway house in Alaska. He has performed thousands of hours of service in the community including coaching little league baseball and youth soccer and volunteering as an assistant Cub and Boy Scout leader. He describes himself as a serious environmentalist ["I laugh only when I am in complete control"] and claims to have been called "Alaska's most notorious composer" due to his classically based protest musical works. He directed a community band for 13 years. Philip Munger lives in on Neklason Lake near Palmer with his wife.

Munger currently serves on some boards, including Friends of Mat-Su as Secretary of the Board, Anchorage Civic Orchestra as vice president, Alaskans for Ethical Government as board member and Alaska Democratic Party as District 13 and Mat-Su Area secretary.

== Musical career ==
Philip Munger attended Oberlin Conservatory and the University of Washington, where he studied melodrama and musical composition. "Throughout his 47 years of composition, Munger has sought to use a variety of techniques to communicate with audiences." He moved to Juneau from Seattle in early 1973, and in 1973 spring he moved to Cordova then in October 1976 to Whittier, Alaska. During 10 years living on Prince William Sound he wrote little music. In October 1983, after moving to the Mat-Su Valley, he began writing what would eventually become nearly 100 compositions, many describing the natural wonders of Alaska, while others addressed various social, humanitarian, ecological/environmental and political issues not generally considered the subject matter of classical compositions.

Munger has been recipient of several grants, prizes, and honors, with his works being performed at the Lincoln Center, Kennedy Center, Juilliard Institute, Cornish Institute, Warsaw Conservatory, the National Gallery, the National Cathedral, and other notable venues.

In 2004 Philip Munger composed a cantata titled The Skies are Weeping, in seven movements for a soprano soloist, chamber choir, and percussion ensemble. The cantata memorializes Rachel Corrie, an American member of the International Solidarity Movement killed in 2003 by a bulldozer operated by the Israel Defense Forces while she tried to prevent a house demolition in the southern Gaza Strip and Tom Hurndall, a British photography student and ISM activist, who was shot in the head in the Gaza Strip by an IDF sniper, Taysir Hayb, during the Second Intifada on 11 April 2003. He fell into a coma and died 9 months later without having regained consciousness. The work's first public performance was scheduled take place on April 27, 2004, at the University of Alaska Anchorage. A public meeting to address objections of members of the Jewish community and others who believed the cantata was one-sided and unfair to Israel failed to resolve disagreements. Following the forum, Munger announced that the performance had been "withdrawn for the safety of the student performers", on his request, citing the "orchestrated" hatemails and threats he and publicly known performers had received (although Mr. Munger said he never turned in the emails to the police because the alleged emails had been deleted). The cantata eventually premiered at the Hackney Empire Theatre in London, England on November 1, 2005.

In January 2005, he has awarded "For Valor" decoration and named to the Department of Veterans Affairs Bugler Hall of Fame, by the service organization called Bugles Across America, for his 5-minute composition titled "Shards" which has been premiered on Jan 23 at the UAA music faculty benefit concert for the local student chapter of Music Educators' National Conference (MENC), 2005, for "honoring America's Afghanistan and Iraq Wars' dead". His subsequent "Shards II," for bugle, electronics and six instruments, premiered in Sitka, Alaska in August 2007. "Shards III," for bugle, electronics, tenor and bass trombones, premiered at UAA in April 2008.

He collaborated Crosssound Festival's concerts in Juneau twice, in 2006 and 2007.

In May 2008, he was awarded a Rasmuson Foundation Fellowship to finance composition of six new works. Philip Munger, plays trombone in the UAA Wind Ensemble.

== Political activism ==
Munger currently serves with the Alaska Democratic Party as secretary of Mat-Su Democrats and of District 13 (Greater Palmer). He worked on the 2008 campaign of Diane Benson for Alaska's U.S. congressional seat. In August 2008, with the selection of Alaska governor Sarah Palin as John McCain's vice-presidential running mate, Munger began a series on his political blog Progressive Alaska entitled "Saradise Lost" heavily critical of Palin. Readership of his blog went from 2,800 readers during the week prior to Palin's pick, to 92,000 readers in the week leading up to the November 2008 presidential election. "Saradise Lost" was later used by Eric Boehlert in his 2009 book on political bloggers, Bloggers on the Bus:How the Internet Changed Politics and the Press, as the title for the chapter on Alaska political blogging, which discussed Munger's blogging activities along with those of other prominent Alaska bloggers credited with pioneering reporting on Palin's candidacy.

=== Anti-creationism efforts and Sarah Palin case ===
New Scientist magazine named eight scientists as heroes and two as villains, under the title "Science heroes and villains of 2008." Munger is also listed there as one of three "non-scientists who deserve special mention" along with Barack Obama. Munger was credited "for doing his bit to counter creationism" by confirming the beliefs of U.S. Republican nominee for vice president, Sarah Palin, that "dinosaurs and humans coexisted 6000 years ago."

In his September 28, 2008 article titled, "Palin treads carefully between fundamentalist beliefs and public policy", reporter Stephen Braun wrote, after Sarah Palin was elected as mayor of Wasilla, Alaska, she startled University of Alaska Anchorage professor Munger who criticized Palin in recent years on his blog "Progressive Alaska" for her creationist beliefs she expressed during a conversation with him. Such notions, related to a common theme of "Young Earth creationism," claim that God created the world about 6,000 years ago, including the contention that dinosaurs and humans coexisted. Most scientists say about 66 million years passed after the extinction of dinosaurs and appearance of the first primitive hominoids. In June 1997, he watched her speech at a graduation ceremony for small group of home-schooled students at an Assembly of God church, where Munger had been conducting the college band. He asked her "Sarah, how can you believe in creationism? Your father's a science teacher." She replied that the two "don't have to agree on everything." Afterward Munger "pushed her on her understanding of the earth's creation, whether it was really less than 7,000 years old and whether dinosaurs and humans walked the earth at the same time," referring to debunked claims regarding Texas fossil tracks dating back tens of millions of years. According to Munger, Palin replied that "she'd had seen pictures of human footprints inside the tracks," contending that dinosaurs and humans supposedly walked the Earth at the same time, contrary to prevailing scientific views. Munger further claimed he asked Palin if she ascribed to the End of Days belief in which the Messiah will return while earth is in total chaos. He said, "She looked in my eyes and said, 'Yes, I think I will see Jesus come back to earth in my lifetime'."

== See also ==
- Rachel Corrie
- The Skies are Weeping
- My Name is Rachel Corrie
- Phil Goldvarg
- Linda McCarriston
