= Adam Shapiro (activist) =

American activist and documentary filmmaker

Adam Shapiro (born 1972) is an American co-founder of the International Solidarity Movement (ISM), a pro-Palestinian organization, the stated mission of which is to bring civilians from around the world to resist nonviolently the Israeli occupation of the West Bank and the Gaza Strip. He became famous for visiting Yasser Arafat in his Mukataa (government palace) in Ramallah while it was besieged during the March 2002 Israeli military operation in the West Bank and Gaza.

== Early life and family ==
Shapiro was born and raised in Brooklyn, New York, and brought up in a Jewish home, but he doesn't "identify as Jewish. I see it as a religion rather than an ethnicity and, as I have no religious feelings, I don't regard myself as Jewish."

Shapiro received his B.A. in political science and history from Washington University in St. Louis in 1993. He subsequently spent a year studying Arabic in Yemen after receiving his M.A. in Arab studies at Georgetown University. He received his M.A. in politics from New York University. He was a doctoral candidate at American University.

== Activism ==
Shapiro worked with "Seeds of Peace," an organization seeks to foster dialogue between Israeli and Palestinian youth. In 2001, he was co-director of the Center for Coexistence in Jerusalem. There he met Huwaida Arraf, a Christian Palestinian American, whom he married in 2002. In 2001 they, along with other Palestinian activists, co-founded the International Solidarity Movement (ISM).

During the 2002 Israeli incursions into the West Bank and Gaza, ISM members would ride in ambulances in the hope of expediting their passage through checkpoints. Shapiro, who was living in Ramallah, volunteered with Irish activist Caoimhe Butterly to ride in ambulances. He recounts hearing that there were wounded people at the headquarters of Yasser Arafat, President of the Palestinian National Authority, and he took an ambulance there to negotiate humanitarian access for the injured. Trapped inside by Israeli troops who refused to let them leave after reaching the injured, they were forced to remain overnight. Shapiro was allowed to leave when a doctor took his place. At the time he left the compound, over 300 people were inside, mostly policemen, though also civilian employees at the headquarters.

Shapiro's visit to Arafat's headquarters was reported in the American press. A New York Post columnist labeled him "the Jewish Taliban", after John Walker Lindh, "the American Taliban" who was captured serving in the Taliban army in Afghanistan. Shapiro's life was threatened, as well as that of his family, credit for which was taken by local chapters of Betar and the Jewish Defense Organization that marched on his home. His parents were temporarily forced out of their home because of the threats.

Shapiro explained his actions to The New York Times:

"I think there's an incorrect supposition that someone who is Jewish necessarily has to stand with Israel, or that someone who is Arab or Muslim has to stand with everything the Palestinians or the Arab countries do. My philosophy is that we're all human beings, and I don't buy into ethnicity and sectarianism. I do what I think is right, and there are plenty of Israelis out there standing with me. Allowing the Palestinians to live in freedom is good for Israel and good for the Jews."

On a subsequent trip to Israel, Shapiro was arrested, jailed, and ordered deported after he was arrested near Huwwara checkpoint when Palestinians from the nearby village protested over 3 weeks of strict curfew. Shapiro was filming the protest and targeted because his was the only camera documenting the suppression of the protest by Israeli forces. Shapiro stated that he left Israel of his own accord, and vowed to appeal, though he stated he was starting a doctoral program at American University. According to Shapiro's Israeli lawyer, little can be done to stop the deportation as Israeli law gives the Minister of the Interior broad discretion to issue deportation orders. Israeli government spokesman Capt. Joseph Dallal stated, "It's unfortunate that time has to be spent on removing people who are there just to cause provocation."

== Documentaries ==
In 2004, Shapiro was part of a collective that released About Baghdad, the first documentary after the 2003 invasion of Iraq. It features the return to Baghdad of the poet Sinan Antoon. In a Democracy Now interview Shapiro said: "I think it's hard to compare although what we’re seeing today in Iraq, unfortunately, and really tragically, is very reminiscent and of the tactics of the occupying forces that we find among Israeli forces."

In 2006, Shapiro, with Aisha Bain and Jen Marlowe, released Darfur Diaries. Filmmakers explored the history of the conflict in Darfur and interviewed refugees and displaced persons, particularly victimized women and children. Shapiro explained his interest in a Democracy Now interview, saying: "[J]ust looking around and seeing what I had been doing in the Occupied Territories, the recent film I had done in Iraq, I realized that if nobody else was going to do it, then it's incumbent upon us as individuals to try to do whatever we could."

Shapiro's next documentary, Chronicles of a Refugee, was a six-part documentary series about the experiences of Palestinian refugees worldwide. Shapiro conducted over 250 interviews in 18 countries. It was aimed primarily for Palestinian and Arab audiences, as it represents a form of oral history of the refugee experience. He was inspired by his experiences trying to find homes for Palestinian refugees fleeing Iraq and having trouble finding countries to offer asylum and resettlement.
