= The Skies are Weeping =

2003 cantata

The Skies are Weeping is a cantata by composer Philip Munger. The cantata memorializes Rachel Corrie and Tom Hurndall.

== Rachel Corrie and Tom Hurndall ==
Rachel Corrie was an American member of the International Solidarity Movement who was killed in 2003 by a bulldozer operated by the Israel Defense Forces when she tried to prevent the demolition of a Palestinian doctor's house in Gaza Strip during the Second Intifada. The official Israel investigation ruled Corrie's death to have been accidental.

Tom Hurndall, a British photography student and ISM activist, was shot in the head in the Gaza Strip by an IDF sniper on April 11, 2003. Hurndall later died without regaining consciousness after nine months in a coma. His death was also ruled accidental by Israel.

== Composition ==
In February 2003, Munger began to seek out material for a song cycle for a soprano soloist and the University of Alaska Percussion Ensemble. The United States was preparing for the invasion of Iraq and Munger became attracted to the song cycle convention known as "Songs of Love and War," highlighting the human response to war. He began to research (mainly on the Internet) other composers' approach to the subject while searching for poems for the composition, and learned of Rachel Corrie's death the following month. He later recalled:

"And, within days, three memorial websites for Rachel, two of them entirely spontaneous, showed up. Memorials in many forms poured in. What interested me were the poems and songs coming from all around the globe: School kids and octogenarians, Jewel wannabes and established songwriters, student writers and poet laureates, Jews and Muslims from all continents; Christians, Buddhists, sectarians".

Munger wrote to poets requesting permission for their poems to be used as lyrics for his cantata. When the texts had been selected, he wrote to Rachel Corrie's family asking their permission (which was granted) to proceed. Choosing the texts proved difficult, and four texts originally chosen were ultimately excluded from the work. Said Munger:

"My hope was that the progression of the texts would reflect an arc of hope for peace emerging from a climate of hatred and violence, a climate which produces such meaningless cruelty as the destruction of over 1,000 houses in South Rafah in a hunt for smuggling tunnels which has yielded between five and 60 such tunnels, depending on which source one uses".

It is composed of seven movements for a soprano soloist, chamber choir, and percussion ensemble. Six of the seven movements have accompanying text. Section one, the choral prelude, is a rare complete setting of the King James version of Psalm 137. Section two is a Dance for Tom Hurndall. Section three is a poem, Rachel, written for Corrie by San Francisco poet Phil Goldvarg on March 18, 2003. Section four is another poem, God the Synecdoche in His Holy Land, written in memory of Rachel Corrie by Alaskan poet Linda McCarriston. Section five is a recitative, I Had No Mercy For Anybody, excerpted from the Gush Shalom translation of Moshe ("Kurdi Bear") Nissim's May 31, 2002 interview ("Jenin, A Soldier's Story") conducted in Hebrew by journalist Tsadok Yeheskeli for Israel's best-selling tabloid newspaper, Yediot Aharonot. Section six is another poem, The Skies Are Weeping, written for Corrie by Sri Lankan poet Thushara Wijeratna. Section seven, Rachel's Words, is excerpted from Corrie's last e-mails to her mother as edited by the composer.

== Planned University of Alaska Anchorage premiere ==
The work's world premiere was scheduled for April 27, 2004 at the University of Alaska Anchorage, where Munger teaches. Munger and a local rabbi (who later described the work as "bordering on anti-Semitic", claiming it "romanticized terrorism") co-chaired a public meeting to address objections from members of the Jewish community and others who believed the cantata was one-sided and unfair to Israel failed to resolve the disagreement. Following the forum, Munger announced that the performance had been "withdrawn for the safety of the student performers" at his request, citing the "orchestrated" hatemails and threats he and other performers had received.

After the meeting, Munger stated in his blog that:

"The low point of the evening, the point at which I finally started to quietly weep and whisper to myself "Oh, dear God!" was when a courageous young Palestinian-American man was shouted down, with one of the shouters yelling something along the lines of "Shut up, you're not even human." Several people then applauded. I observed two high Republicans, a state representative and a former state party treasurer, apparently nodding affirmation."

According to Munger "People were shouting, leaving, arguing, interrupting" him as he tried to deliver his prepared statement:

"Over the past five days local artists preparing for the premiere of "The Skies are Weeping" have been subjected to a growing crescendo of internet virus attacks, hate mail and bizarre religious-political polemics. It appears to be orchestrated. Some of the incoming venom is quite threatening. After consulting with staff here at the University of Alaska Anchorage Department of Music, I have decided that I cannot subject sixteen students, whose names, fortunately, have not been released to anyone, to any possibility of physical harm or to the type of character assassination some of us are already undergoing. Performance of "The Skies are Weeping" at this time and place is withdrawn for the safety of the student performers. This decision has been mine alone, with no pressure whatsoever from the school or university."

=== Hatemails and cancellation ===
George Bryson, from the Anchorage Daily News, wrote that Munger told him:

"Almost immediately, ... he was inundated with unsolicited e-mail from outside Alaska, a lot of it hateful - "just threatening, harassing, bizarre ... short of the stuff you'd take to the troopers", however after "some of his student musicians received threatening messages too" that become an issue since "it was one thing to invite problems on himself; it was quite another to inflict them on his students."

Amanda Coyne from Anchorage Press wrote that Munger told her "even before a forum was held to discuss his work ... hate email was showing up on his computer" and Bishko told, he's been receiving threatening emails and "taking heat".

On April 6, 2004 at 3:52:05 AM, a user claiming to be Dr. Jeff Pezzati sent an email to Philip Munger:

Hello Philip,
My name is Jeff Pezzati, I am a professor of composition at the University of Southern California. My pieces have won ASCAP, BMI prizes and the Prix de Rome. I have been informed of your anti-Semitic cantata that is to be performed. This will not be tolerated by the American composer community. The suicide victim "Rachel Corrie," who you are apparently trying to honor in this piece, killed herself for the cause of promoting Arab terrorism and murder against Jews. I have discussed this with such colleagues as John Corigliano, John Harrison, John Adams, etc. 'We have all agreed that your music is to be banned from performance in the continental United States. Consider yourself blacklisted.

According to Bryson, the "onslaught of threats by Pezzati and others proved effective" for Munger, and by Tuesday, April 6 "the threats against student performer increasingly specific prompted notification of UAA security and appropriate administrators". Munger became convinced that "professional educators, no matter how firm their belief in freedom of expression could not risk students to the growing level of insecurity many were enduring", so he decided to cancel the performance of The Skies are Weeping at that time "for the safety of the student performers". Bryson wrote that Munger said two days before the public forum that he talked the situation over with Department of Music chairwoman Karen Strid, who felt the cantata's debut performance April 27 should go ahead as planned; she finally concurred, however, after Munger argued it should be cancelled. Munger further argued that anyone who went into the meeting thinking his "concerns for student safety to be exaggerated or unwarranted, and who also left the meeting feeling the same way, should not be making such safety decisions."

== World premiere in London ==
The cantata eventually had its world premiere on November 1, 2005 at the Hackney Empire Theatre in London, England. It was performed by soprano Deborah Naomi Fink, pianist Dominic Saunders, the Coro Cervantes Choir and the London Percussion Ensemble directed by Peter Crockford. Fink, a member of the United Kingdom organization Jews for Justice for Palestinians, also organized the concert; it attracted endorsements from such figures as MIT linguistics Professor Noam Chomsky, British film actress Julie Christie and the Nobel-prizewinning English playwright Harold Pinter.

The two-hour concert also featured the United Kingdom premiere of Singer of Wind and Rain, five Palestinian lyrics for mixed choir set by Gregory Youtz (composed in 2000); music and dance performed by Al-Hurriyya Palestinian Dabka Dance Group, whose members came from Palestine, Iraq, Lebanon and the United Kingdom; and the Tsivi Sharrett Ensemble, which fuses Yemenite, Israeli, and Palestinian songs with jazz. A protest outside the premiere sought to highlight Israeli girls and women killed in suicide bombings during the Second Intifada - calling them the "other Rachels" – while a counter-protest by "pro-Palestine groups…including Jews Against Zionism" supported the concert. Munger asserted that he was not "bothered by the protest outside the cantata's premiere", for "they have rights to their opinions just as" he does, and said "if there are any seats left, I'm going to invite anyone outside to come in and listen. I'll pay for their seats."

Patrons of the concert were Yasmin Alibhai-Brown, Professor Noam Chomsky, Julie Christie, Sir Richard Eyre, Moris Farhi MBE, Uri Fruchtmann, Jane Manning OBE, Susie Orbach, Roger Lloyd-Pack, Dr. Ilan Pappe, Anthony Payne, John Pilger, Harold Pinter CH, Sir Antony Sher, Professor Avi Shlaim, MP Clare Short, Baroness Jenny Tonge and Susannah York.

Supporters included the Corrie Family, Jocelyn Hurndall, Afif Safieh (former Palestinian General Delegate to the UK), MP Jeremy Corbyn, Jeremy Hardy, Miriam Karlin, Miriam Margolyes OBE, Musicians Against Nuclear Arms, Andy de la Tour, Frances de la Tour, Lynne Reid Banks, Jews for Justice for Palestinians, Jewish Socialists' Group, Just Peace UK, the International Solidarity Movement, Palestine Solidarity Campaign and the Council for Arab-British Understanding.

== See also ==
- My Name is Rachel Corrie
