= Amira al Hayb =

First female Bedouin Arab soldier in an Israeli combat position

- أميرة الهيب
- Born: 1985 (age 40–41); Tuba-Zangariyye, Israel
- Employer: Israel Defense Forces
- Relatives: Taysir Hayb

Amira al Hayb (Arabic: أميرة الهيب, Hebrew: אמירה אל הייב; born in 1985) is the first female Bedouin-Arab soldier to serve in a combat role in the Israel Defense Forces (IDF). Aside from the IDF, al-Hayb also served in the Israel Border Police. She is the sister of IDF sniper Taysir Hayb, a convicted murderer who shot ISM activist Tom Hurndall in the head in the Gaza Strip.

== Biography ==
Amira al Hayb was born in Tuba-Zangariyye in the Upper Galilee. Her family moved to Wadi Hamaam when she was a few months old. At the age of 19, al Hayb decided to join the Israel Defense Forces. While the recruitment of male Bedouin is common in Israel, this was considered taboo for women. Nur al Hayb, "father of the Bedouin soldiers," a disabled IDF veteran from Eilabun village, came to her aid.

Al Hayb had to undergo recruit training twice due to language problems but eventually joined the Israel Border Police. Her position as the first female Bedouin soldier attracted media attention. She has met with many leading figures in Israel, among them the Israeli President Moshe Katsav and the Israeli Chief of Staff, Shaul Mofaz.

Amira's brother, Taysir Hayb, received an 8-year prison sentence for manslaughter in the death of International Solidarity Movement activist Tom Hurndall, but was released after five years.

== See also ==
- Elinor Joseph
- Women in the Israel Defense Forces
- Women in the military
