= About Baghdad =

2004 American documentary film

- Directed by: Sinan Antoon; Bassam Haddad; Maya Mikdashi; Suzy Salamy; Adam Shapiro
- Produced by: Adam Shapiro
- Starring: Sinan Antoon
- Cinematography: Bassam Haddad; Maya Mikdashi
- Edited by: Carol Mansour
- Music by: Amer Tawfiq
- Release date: 2004
- Running time: 90 minutes
- Country: United States
- Languages: Arabic; English

About Baghdad is a documentary film shot in Baghdad, Iraq in July 2003, 3 months after the collapse of the Saddam Hussein regime. Additionally, It is the first documentary film to have been made in Iraq following the fall of the Baath regime. The film features the artist Sinan Antoon as he returns to his native Baghdad, after leaving Iraq in 1991. It privileges the voices of native Iraqis from all walks of life, as they present their views on life during the regime of Saddam Hussein as well as the United States's bombing, invasion, and occupation. Thus, the aim of the documentary is to provide insight in the complexity of the Iraqi's perspectives and to move beyond the marginalization and misrepresentations of the Iraqi's voices by mainstream media.

The film was directed by a collective including Sinan Antoon, Bassam Haddad, Maya Mikdashi, Suzy Salamy, Rania Masri and Adam Shapiro. It was produced by Quilting Point Productions (formerly known as InCounter Productions), Arab Studies Institute.

== Synopsis ==
The documentary was filmed in July 2003, which was 3 months after the fall of the Saddam Hussein Regime. Sinan Antoon conducts relatively short interviews with Iraqi's in Baghdad, as a way to voice their opinions on not only the fallen Saddam Hussein Regime, but also the current occupation of The United States in Iraq. The documentary explores perspectives that differ from either pro-US or pro-Saddam, including perspectives such as the wish for an Iraqi to rule the country. The Iraqi people represented in the documentary differ from a wide range of ethnic and socio-economic backgrounds: politicians, poets, taxi drivers, wealthier people and less wealthy people. The documentary thus shows a variety of differing opinions, such as American soldiers who see themselves as saviors and liberators, in contrast to less wealthy people stating that the Americans are occupiers, to a lot of perspectives in between.

== Production ==
The documentary was filmed in Baghdad, 3 months after the collapse of Saddam Hussein's regime. Sinan Antoon had spent 3 weeks walking around Baghdad interviewing as many people as possible for him and his crew.

The team that contributed to the production of the documentary consists of: Sinan Antoon (novelist and poet), Adam Shapiro (founder of the International Solidarity Movement), Rania Masri (director of Southern Research and Education Centre), Bassam Haddad (professor of Political Science at the Saint Joseph's University), Suzy Salamy (a New York-based film maker) and Maya Mikdashi (a Georgetown University graduate).

The movie makes use of an interesting interplay between chaotic scenes (such as being out on the streets surrounded by a crowd of people or interviewing a taxi driver while being on the road) and scenic scenes with no sound at all or a scenic scene accompanied by classical Iraqi songs. The rather chaotic setup presented by the producers does not only aim to reflect the current situation in Baghdad in terms of destruction, additionally it also aims to reflect the spiritual chaos Iraqi's are faced with, after encountering several wars and repressive regimes.

== Awards ==
- "Best Documentary" prize, at the Big Apple Film Festival Award in New York (2004)
