= James Miller (filmmaker) =

Welsh film cinematographer (1968–2003)

- James Miller in Rafah
- Born: 18 December 1968; Haverfordwest, Pembrokeshire, Wales
- Died: 2 May 2003 (aged 34); Rafah, Gaza Strip
- Cause of death: Gunshot wound
- Occupations: Cameraman, film producer, film director
- Spouse: Sophy Warren-Knott (m. 1997)

James Henry Dominic Miller (18 December 1968 – 2 May 2003) was a Welsh cameraman, producer, and director, and recipient of numerous awards, including five Emmy Awards. He was killed by Israel Defense Forces (IDF) gunfire while filming a documentary in the Gaza Strip. Miller worked regularly with Saira Shah for several years, and they formed a business partnership to operate an independent production company called Frostbite Productions in 2001.

The Israeli Military Police investigation into Miller's death closed on 9 March 2005 with an announcement that the soldier suspected of firing the shot would not be indicted as they could not establish that his shot was responsible, though he would be disciplined for violating the rules of engagement and for changing his account of the incident. On 6 April 2006, the inquest jury at St Pancras Coroner's Court in London returned a verdict of unlawful killing, finding that Miller had been "murdered." Forensic experts from London Metropolitan Police concluded that the bullets were consistent with those used by the IDF. After meetings with the Miller family, the Attorney General, Lord Goldsmith, sent a formal request to his Israeli counterpart in June 2007 for prosecution proceedings to be enacted within six weeks against the soldier responsible for firing the shot. The requests were ignored by the Israeli government and prosecution proceedings have never been held.

== Early life and family ==
James Miller was born in Haverfordwest, Pembrokeshire, Wales, the younger son of Geoffrey Miller, an army officer who later rose to the rank of colonel, and his wife, Eileen, a headmistress. He grew up in the West Country, but from ages six to eight lived in the Outer Hebrides, where his father was posted. Raised as a Roman Catholic, he maintained that faith for the whole of his life. He was educated at Downside and later at the London College of Printing, where within a few weeks his tutors promoted him to the postgraduate course in photo-journalism. He worked as a photographer before moving to television.

In 1997, he married Sophy Warren-Knott, with whom he had a son, Alexander, and a daughter, Charlotte.

== Career ==
Miller started his working life as a freelance cameraman, and in 1995 joined the Frontline News collective as cameraman, producer, and director. He reported from the civil war in Algeria and from most of the world's major trouble spots from 1995 onwards, working for CNN, and for all the leading news broadcasters in Britain.

In 1999 he made his first film for Hardcash Productions, Prime Suspects, about a massacre in Kosovo for Channel 4's Dispatches programme. This film won the Royal Television Society (RTS) award for International Current Affairs in 1999. Almost every film he made for Hardcash won major awards. Prime Suspects was followed by Dying for the President about the Second Chechen War and Children of the Secret State about Korea, both also for Dispatches.

Miller then formed a professional association with television reporter Saira Shah, to make Beneath the Veil, about the life of women in Taliban-run Afghanistan. This film, shown on Dispatches and CNN, repeated the success of Prime Suspects by again winning the RTS International Current Affairs award. It also won an Emmy Award, a BAFTA, and the RTS "Programme of the Year" award. In addition, Miller won the RTS craft award for his outstanding photography. Miller and Shah's second film, Unholy War, shot at the height of the Afghanistan war in 2001, won Miller his first Emmy as director and (together with Beneath the Veil) also the prestigious Peabody award. Miller and Shah almost died of sub-zero temperatures while crossing the Hindu Kush during the making of this film. Frostbite Films was the name of the independent film production company set up by Miller and Shah in 2001 after this experience.

Miller and Shah were working on a documentary for the US cable network HBO at the time of his death. The resulting film, Death in Gaza, was released in 2004, and won three Emmys and one BAFTA TV award in 2005. Miller received posthumously the Rory Peck Award for Features in 2004 for Death in Gaza, having been a finalist on three previous occasions.

After Miller's death, his friend Fergal Keane wrote: "James Miller was one of the finest journalistic talents I have ever known. Had he lived he would undoubtedly have come to be recognised as one of the greatest documentary makers of his generation. As it is he leaves a journalistic legacy of immense worth."

== Death ==
The documentary which Miller was making on the day of his death (Death in Gaza, released by HBO in 2004) depicts Miller and his colleagues leaving the home of a Palestinian family in the Rafah refugee camp after dark, carrying a white flag, towards two IDF armoured personnel carriers manned by nine soldiers of the Desert Reconnaissance Battalion, a unit of Bedouin Arab-Israeli soldiers. They had walked about 20 metres from the veranda when the first shot rang out. For 13 seconds, there was silence broken only by Shah's cry: "We are British journalists." Then came the second shot, which killed Miller. He was shot in the front of his neck. The soldier who shot him was identified as First Lieutenant Hib al-Heib. According to a forensic expert, the fatal shot was fired from less than 200 metres away. Immediately after the shooting, the IDF said that Miller had been shot in the back during crossfire. It later retracted the assertion that he had been shot in the back. According to witnesses there was no crossfire and none can be heard on the APTN tape.

An IDF spokesperson made the following statement after Miller's death: "The IDF expresses sorrow at the death of the cameraman who entered a combat zone. Cameramen who knowingly enter a combat zone endanger themselves as well as the troops, and clearly run the risk of being caught in the crossfire." An IDF spokesperson described the circumstances of his death as occurring during "an operation taking place at night, in which the [Israeli] force was under fire and in which the force returned fire with light weapons."

IDF spokesman, Captain Jacob Dallal said, "Our forces found a tunnel at the house in question, when an anti-tank missile was fired on them. They shot back at the source of the attack ... James Miller was apparently hit during that exchange. The Israeli military expresses sorrow at a civilian death, but it must be stressed that a cameraman who knowingly enters a combat zone, especially at night, endangers himself."

== Aftermath ==
On 9 March 2005, the IDF closed the Miller case, announcing that the soldier believed responsible for the shooting would not be indicted. Military Advocate General Avichai Mandelblit ruled that there was insufficient evidence to prosecute. The army said Military Police had carefully investigated the incident but had been unable to establish the soldier's guilt. "The findings of the military police show that an Israel Defence Forces (IDF) lieutenant, the commanding officer of the IDF force at the site, allegedly fired his weapon in breach of IDF Rules of engagement," a statement said. "However, it is not legally possible to link this shooting to the gunshot sustained by Mr. Miller." The army did say that the soldier would be disciplined for violating the rules of engagement and for changing his account of the incident. It did not elaborate. Heib was subjected to a disciplinary hearing before Brigadier General Guy Tzur, head of the IDF Southern Command. Despite advice from the Israeli Military Advocate General that he be disciplined for breaching the rules of engagement, illegal use of weapons, and misconduct during the investigation, he was cleared of wrongdoing. Military prosecutors appealed the acquittal, but he was cleared in a second hearing as well. Heib was subsequently promoted from First Lieutenant to Captain.

Miller's family expressed disappointment at the decision. His widow Sophy said, "Nothing can express our outrage that, waiting for two years and putting our faith in a system which has now failed to deliver, we still have prosecutors who suspect and continue to suspect a commanding officer and who will only bring disciplinary measures because of an initial flawed investigative process. The truth will come out and we hope the Israeli judicial system will mete out justice. This investigation does not serve the IDF, decent Israeli citizens, us, his family, and, above all, James."

British Foreign Office Minister Baroness Symons said she was "dismayed" by the decision. "I deeply sympathise with James' family, who have worked so hard to secure justice for James. The British government will continue to raise James's case with the government of Israel."

The Metropolitan Police opened an investigation into Miller's death which was led by Detective Rob Anderson of the Specialist Crime Directorate. Anderson later told the inquest that the investigation was hampered by Israel's unwillingness to cooperate. The Metropolitan Police was refused permission to send officers to Israel and the Gaza Strip in order to visit the site of the shooting and interview soldiers and witnesses to the incident and the Israeli government did not release vital documents to the Coroner. Based on the evidence available to the investigation, Anderson concluded that Miller could only have been killed by gunfire from Israeli soldiers.

=== Legal action against Israeli government ===
On 2 May 2005, the second anniversary of Miller's death, his family initiated a lawsuit against the Israeli government. The family charge that the Israeli army did not act with reasonable caution when troops opened fire on Miller, who was holding a white flag. Miller's widow Sophy said the family was determined to find justice and put an end to the "culture of impunity" within the Israeli army. "It is our hope that as well as accountability for James' death a successful civil case will go some way towards changing this and in doing so may make Israeli soldiers think twice about shooting innocent civilians," she told The Guardian.

More than two years later, on 5 August 2007, the family's lawyer, Michael Sfard, said, "The family demands justice, both criminal and civil. They deserve that the man who shot their loved one for no reason whatsoever should be indicted and get what he deserves. As he left a widow and two children, they deserve to be compensated by the State of Israel. This is something the political and military echelons have promised time and again, but they have not fulfilled their promise so far."

On 1 February 2009 it was reported that James Miller's family had accepted a £1.5 million payout from Israel. In a statement, the family did not confirm the amount paid but did say that it was "probably the closest we'll get to an admission of guilt on the part of the Israelis".

== Coroner's inquest ==
The inquest into Miller's death opened at the St Pancras Coroner's Court in London on 3 April 2006.

Giving evidence at the inquest, Miller's wife Sophy named the Israeli soldier who shot her husband as First Lieutenant Heib from the Bedouin Desert Reconnaissance Battalion, who was commanding a unit at the time of the killing on 2 May 2003. She said that the IDF had given out misleading information from the moment her husband was shot, and that Lt. Heib had given six testimonies, all of which were conflicting.

Footage of Miller's death was shown to an unnamed Israeli soldier who was quoted as saying that members of the IDF should not fire unless they felt they were under threat. He was quoted as saying: "There is no chance that it was an accident – the soldier could clearly see him, it was a perfect shot. I do not know what to say, it looks like murder, it looks like he wants to kill him."

The court heard that an autopsy proved that Miller died from a "classic sniper's shot", and that the bullet was consistent with that used by the IDF. Independent investigator Chris Cobb-Smith, who had previously served in the British Army and as an Iraq weapons inspector, found there was no way the soldier fired by accident. He told the court, "This was calculated and cold-blooded murder, without a shadow of a doubt." He added, "These shots were not fired by a soldier who was frightened, not fired by a soldier facing incoming fire – these were slow, deliberate, calculated and aimed shots ... It is a soldier aiming and firing deliberately. He should not have been firing anywhere near a lit building, anywhere near where he knew there were women, children or foreign journalists."

Daniel Edge, Miller's assistant producer, (who narrowly escaped being shot himself during the same incident) said Israeli soldiers put pressure on him to say that the shot came from Palestinians. He told the inquest: "They personally tried to get me to say the sentence 'James could have been shot by a Palestinian', which I refused to say."

On 6 April 2006, the jury returned a verdict of unlawful killing, finding that he had been "murdered". Miller's family asked that the British government ensure his killer is prosecuted, accusing the Israeli authorities of "an abject failure to uphold the fundamental and unequivocal standards of international humanitarian and human rights law."

== Request for prosecution ==
In June 2007, Lord Goldsmith, the then outgoing Attorney General for England and Wales, sent a request to his Israeli counterpart, Attorney General Menachem Mazuz, for legal proceedings to be enacted within six weeks to prosecute the soldier responsible for the killing, which included new analysis of audio evidence which confirmed that the shot that killed Miller was fired from an Israeli armoured personnel carrier. The request stipulated that if Israel failed to respond within six weeks, British authorities would consider prosecuting Captain al-Heib in the UK.

Miller's sister, Anne Waddington, was interviewed by the BBC on the morning of 7 August 2007, the day the six-week deadline was due to expire. She said, "Unfortunately, we have had four and a half extremely painful years of experiencing the Israeli tactics, and they are the masters of delay – they have always played for time, and they have always failed to deliver." She added, "The Israelis put out a lot of false and misleading statements immediately after my brother was murdered, and they did try to suggest he was killed by a Palestinian in the back and as a result of crossfire, but they put out many, many lies and false stories, which of course have been shown not only on the APTN video footage of the actual murder, but also through eyewitness testimony and the additional evidence which was very, very clear at the time." Asked whether she used the word "murder" very deliberately, she replied, "Yes I do, and of course the jury in the inquest last year found, very unusually, that it wasn't just unlawful killing, it was actually murder."

On 7 August 2007, Mazuz requested more information on the new analysis. After being informed of his response, Miller's family issued a statement:

We are very pleased that General [sic] Mazuz has replied within the time limit set out in Lord Goldsmith's letter. This information has for the most part been in the possession of the Israeli investigators for more than four years. We will look on with interest to see whether Israel will seek to undermine the expertise of the Metropolitan Police's acoustic examination, or perhaps this will be the first significant step towards Israel pursuing justice.

At the request of Miller's family, Lord Goldsmith agreed to ask the UK Crown Prosecution Service to advise "on whether there is enough evidence for a prosecution in the UK under the Geneva Conventions Act in which case the UK government could request extradition." Eventually, the Israeli government agreed to pay the Miller family £1.75 million, if the British government agreed to close the case, and not demand the extradition of the Israeli soldiers involved in his killing.

== Filmography ==
- Prime Suspects (1999)
- Dying for the President (2000)
- Children of the Secret State (2000)
- Beneath the Veil (2001)
- Unholy War (2001)
- The Tramp and the Dictator (2002)
- The Road from Rio (2002)
- The Trade Trap (2002)
- The Perfect Famine (2002)
- Armenia: The Betrayed (2002)
- Death in Gaza (2004)

== See also ==
- Gaza Strip
- List of journalists killed during the Israeli–Palestinian conflict
- Iain Hook - British UNRWA worker fatally wounded by IDF sniper in the West Bank, 22 November 2002.
- Tom Hurndall – British ISM volunteer fatally shot in the head in Gaza by IDF sniper, 11 April 2003.
- Rachel Corrie – American ISM volunteer killed by Israeli bulldozer in Gaza, 16 March 2003.
- Brian Avery – American ISM volunteer shot and severely disfigured in Jenin, 5 April 2003.
- Vittorio Arrigoni – Italian ISM volunteer kidnapped and executed by militants in Gaza, 15 April 2011.
- Ayşenur Ezgi Eygi – Turkish-American ISM volunteer who was shot in the head by an Israeli sniper in the West Bank, 6 September 2024

== Sources ==
- Alleyne, Richard (4 April 2006). "Israelis destroyed evidence, claims filmmaker's widow". London: The Daily Telegraph.
- "Awards for Death in Gaza". IMDb.
- "BBC Radio 4 Today Programme Listen Again". BBC. 7 August 2007. The audio can be heard by clicking on the link for the "0830 - 0900" segment; the interview starts after 8 minutes 10 seconds.
- Calkin, Jessamy (1 April 2013). "Difficult truths: Saira Shah interview". The Daily Telegraph.
- "Film-maker's death 'was murder'". BBC. 4 April 2006b.
- Freeman, Simon (4 April 2006). "Film-maker was victim of 'cold-blooded murder'". The Times. London.
- Frenkel, Sheera (23 April 2008). "Israel to pay £1.75m to family of James Miller in deal over killers". The Times. London. Archived from the original on 12 October 2008.
- Greenberg, Hanan (9 March 2005). "U.K. cameraman killing case closed". Yedioth Ahronoth.
- Henshaw, David (7 May 2003). "James Miller: Renowned filmer of recent conflicts". Obituaries. The Guardian. London.
- "Israel 'delayed' death inquiries". BBC. 3 April 2006a.
- "Israel: No criminal charges against IDF soldier in journalist's shooting death". Committee to Protect Journalists (CPJ). 9 March 2005.
- Jones, Sam (3 May 2005). "Briton's family sues over shooting". The Guardian. London.
- Keane, Fergal (7 May 2003a). "James Miller: documentary-maker". Obituaries. The Independent. London. Archived from the original on 30 September 2007.
- Keane, Fergal (7 May 2003b). "James Miller obituary". BBC.
- McCarthy, Rory (8 August 2007). "Israel replies in shooting inquiry". The Guardian. London.
- "New enquiry into murder of award-winning cameraman James Miller". Christian Khan Solicitors. 8 August 2007. Archived from the original on 28 September 2007.
- Regular, Arnon; Harel, Amos (4 May 2003). "London calls for probe into Gaza death of British journalist". Ha'aretz. Archived from the original on 1 October 2007.
- "The Rory Peck Awards 2004". The Rory Peck Trust. 2004. Archived from the original on 28 September 2007.
- "Rory Peck Awards 2004". British Film Institute. 4 November 2004. Archived from the original on 30 May 2008.
- "RTS Craft and Design Awards – 2000". Royal Television Society. Archived from the original on 25 October 2007.
- "RTS Television Journalism Awards 1999". Royal Television Society. Archived from the original on 28 September 2007.
- "RTS Television Journalism Awards 2000–2001". Royal Television Society. Archived from the original on 28 September 2007.
- "Shot Briton's family 'gets £1.5m'". BBC News. 1 February 2009.
- Silver, Eric (6 August 2007). "Award-winning film-maker's death divides UK and Israel". The Independent. London. Archived from the original on 1 October 2007.
- Smith, Michael (5 August 2007). "Britain tells Israel to try soldier for killing film-maker". The Guardian. London.
- "Statement by Baroness Symons following the James Miller verdict". British Embassy, Tel Aviv. 9 March 2005. Archived from the original on 28 September 2007.
- Sweeney, John (30 October 2003). "Silenced Witnesses". The Independent. London. Archived from the original on 29 March 2007.
- Tryhorn, Chris (6 April 2006). "Miller's family push for prosecution". The Times. London.
- Wallace, Kelley (3 May 2003). "Journalist killed covering Gaza clash: Cameraman was honored for Afghanistan documentaries". CNN.
