= Philip Michael Goldvarg =

American poet

Philip Michael Goldvarg (13 March 1934 – 14 June 2004) was an American poet, activist and member of the Zapatista Solidarity Coalition.

== Personal life ==
Goldvarg lived in Sacramento, California, in the United States. He participated in poetry readings at local schools and coffee houses, and was also known for his activism. He died from a brain tumor in June 2004. Goldvarg was honored posthumously in 2004 for "his artistry and commitment to justice" by Making Things Grow, a Sacramento group formed by artists, community agencies and businesses.

== Notable work ==
His work has been published in Ventana Abierta-Revista Latina, Drum Voices Review, and Voz de Zapatistas. Two collections of poetry, Palabras de Elena and What Makes Bones Talk have been published in book form, and other collections, such as Chiapas en el Corazón and Cantos de Chihuahua, were published in periodicals and journals. One of Goldvarg's poems was used in the cantata "The Skies are Weeping" by Philip Munger.
