= Iain Hook =

British aid worker killed by Israeli sniper

- The identity card of UNRWA's Jenin project manager, Iain John Hook.
- Born: Iain John Hook; 1948; Essex, England
- Died: 22 November 2002 (aged 53–54); Jenin, West Bank
- Cause of death: Gunshot wound
- Occupation: Project Manager
- Years active: ????–2002
- Employer: UNRWA
- Height: 6 ft 1 in (1.85 m)
- Children: 4

Iain John Hook (1948 – 22 November 2002) was a British aid worker and military officer who worked for the United Nations Relief and Works Agency for Palestine Refugees in the Near East (UNRWA) as project manager in the rebuilding of Jenin Refugee Camp in West Bank, which was home to 13,000 Palestinian refugees.

After Hook left a voice message with Israeli authorities that Palestinian militants ("shabab"-youth) had "knocked a hole in the wall" and "pinned down" his men, during an engagement in Jenin, he was shot and killed by an Israel Defense Forces sniper. Israeli Army radio said that the sniper who killed him mistook his cell phone for a handgun or grenade. A United Nations Security Council resolution condemning Israel was vetoed by the United States. In 2005, a British inquest jury returned a verdict of unlawful killing.

== Early life ==
Iain John Hook was born in Felixstowe, Suffolk, in 1948. He was subsequently commissioned into the British Army's Parachute Regiment. Hook married and had three sons and a daughter; two of his sons later served in the British Armed Forces as officers. After being discharged from the British military, Hook began working for the United Nations (UN) as an aid worker, supervising the construction of a hospital in Pristina, Kosovo, in 1999. Hook also worked on UN projects in East Timor, Afghanistan, and Serbia.

== Death and subsequent events ==
=== UNRWA work ===
Iain Hook was working for United Nations Relief and Works Agency for Palestine Refugees in the Near East (UNRWA) — which is "created to administer Palestinian refugee camps set up after the 1948 Arab-Israeli war"— as project manager in the rebuilding of Jenin refugee camp in West Bank, which was home to 13,000 Palestinian refugees. In October 2002, Hook arrived at the Palestinian refugee camp in Jenin to oversee the rebuilding of the camp.

=== Death ===
On 22 November 2002, Hook left a voice message with Israeli authorities that armed Palestinian militants ("shabab"-youth) had "knocked a hole in the wall" of the UNRWA compound and "pinned down" his men. An Israeli spokesman released a tape recording of a message he received from Hook on his cell phone that day. In his call, Hook asked the Israelis for assistance, saying that Palestinian militants were attempting to break down the walls of the UNRWA compound.

During a gun-battle that then ensued with Islamic Jihad militants whom Israel says were firing at troops from inside the UN compound, an Israeli military sniper killed Hook. Israeli Army radio said that the sniper who killed him mistook his cell phone for a handgun or grenade. The United Nations stated that there were no gunmen at the compound, and dispute the claims that the shooting was a mistake; Hook was shot in the back by a sniper with a scoped rifle, from a distance of 20 meters. Co-workers evacuated Hook through the hole in the wall, but he died of a gunshot wound to the abdomen before reaching a hospital.

==== Ambulance controversy ====
United Nations said it immediately arranged an ambulance for patient evacuation but said Israeli soldiers on the field delayed the ambulance sent to evacuate Hook and changed its route, later echoed by then UN secretary-general Kofi Annan. Israel military officials denied the charge.

UNRWA immediately arranged for an ambulance to evacuate the wounded staff member but the IDF soldiers on the ground refused immediate access for the ambulance and there appears to have been a delay before the staff member could be evacuated by an alternative route. Sadly, he died before arrival at the hospital. It is not known at this time whether the delay resulted in the death.

— UNRWA Press Statement 22 November 2002

The IDF said, in contrast, it tried to evacuate Hook immediately after the shooting, and that he died en route to the hospital.

=== Diplomatic response ===
Israeli Foreign Minister Benjamin Netanyahu telephoned the British Foreign Minister, Jack Straw to express regrets over Hook's death. The United States vetoed "with regret" a United Nation Security Council resolution proposed by Syria condemning Israel for the killing; there were 12 votes in favor of the resolution, and 2 abstentions, in the 15 nation vote. United States ambassador John D. Negroponte said Syria and the Palestinians seemed "more intent on condemning Israeli occupation than on ensuring the safety of United Nations personnel." UN Secretary General Kofi Annan released a statement demanding that Israel punish those responsible for the killing. Israel, however, found that "no criminal act had been committed" and no criminal charges were filed.

More than sixty United Nations workers wrote a letter criticizing Israeli troops for "senseless" and "wanton" behavior, complaining of abuse and humiliation. Israel responded by releasing to newspapers what the New York Times called a "damning intelligence report" saying UNRWA operations were being used as cover for "Palestinian terrorists", including smuggling arms in UN ambulances and hosting meetings of Tanzim in UN buildings. The United Nations internal report on the matter was the subject of controversy: the initial version stated that peace activists in the compound were bringing young Palestinian men into the compound through a hole in the wall. Following protests by UNWRA staff, the claim was dropped from the report.

=== Coroner's inquest ===
Coroner Dr Peter Dean opened the inquest at Ipswich Crown Court. In 2005, Irish activist Caoimhe Butterly gave written eyewitness testimony in the inquest into the killing of Hook by an Israeli military sniper. After the court proceedings jurors unanimously delivered the verdict that the Israeli military was fully accountable for the unlawful killing of Hook. Dr Peter Hansen, former Commissioner General of the UNRWA, said that "over the past four years 13 UNRWA workers, including Mr. Hook, had been shot in similar circumstances by the Israeli army". In a statement after the verdict, Paul Wolstenholme, a colleague of Hook who was in the compound at time of the shooting, said the Israeli sniper would have known he was not a Palestinian. "It was not a case of mistaken identity, it was a deliberate act," he said.

=== Payment ===
The Israeli government made an ex gratia payment to the Hook family in an agreement with the British government. The Foreign Office (UK) did not reveal the details under the Freedom of Information Act for "releasing information on the death that could damage Britain's relations with another state", while John Gillan, of the Foreign and Commonwealth Office claimed other information on the death could not be released which is related to the "formulation or development of government policy."

== See also ==
- Tom Hurndall – British ISM volunteer fatally wounded in Gaza by IDF sniper, 11 April 2003.
- James Miller – British filmmaker fatally shot in Gaza by IDF sniper, 2 May 2003.
- Rachel Corrie – American ISM volunteer killed by Israeli bulldozer in Gaza, 16 March 2003.
- Brian Avery – American ISM volunteer shot and severely disfigured in Jenin, 5 April 2003.
- Ayşenur Ezgi Eygi – Turkish-American ISM volunteer who was shot in the head by an Israeli sniper in the West Bank, 6 September 2024
