= Huwaida Arraf =

American lawyer and activist

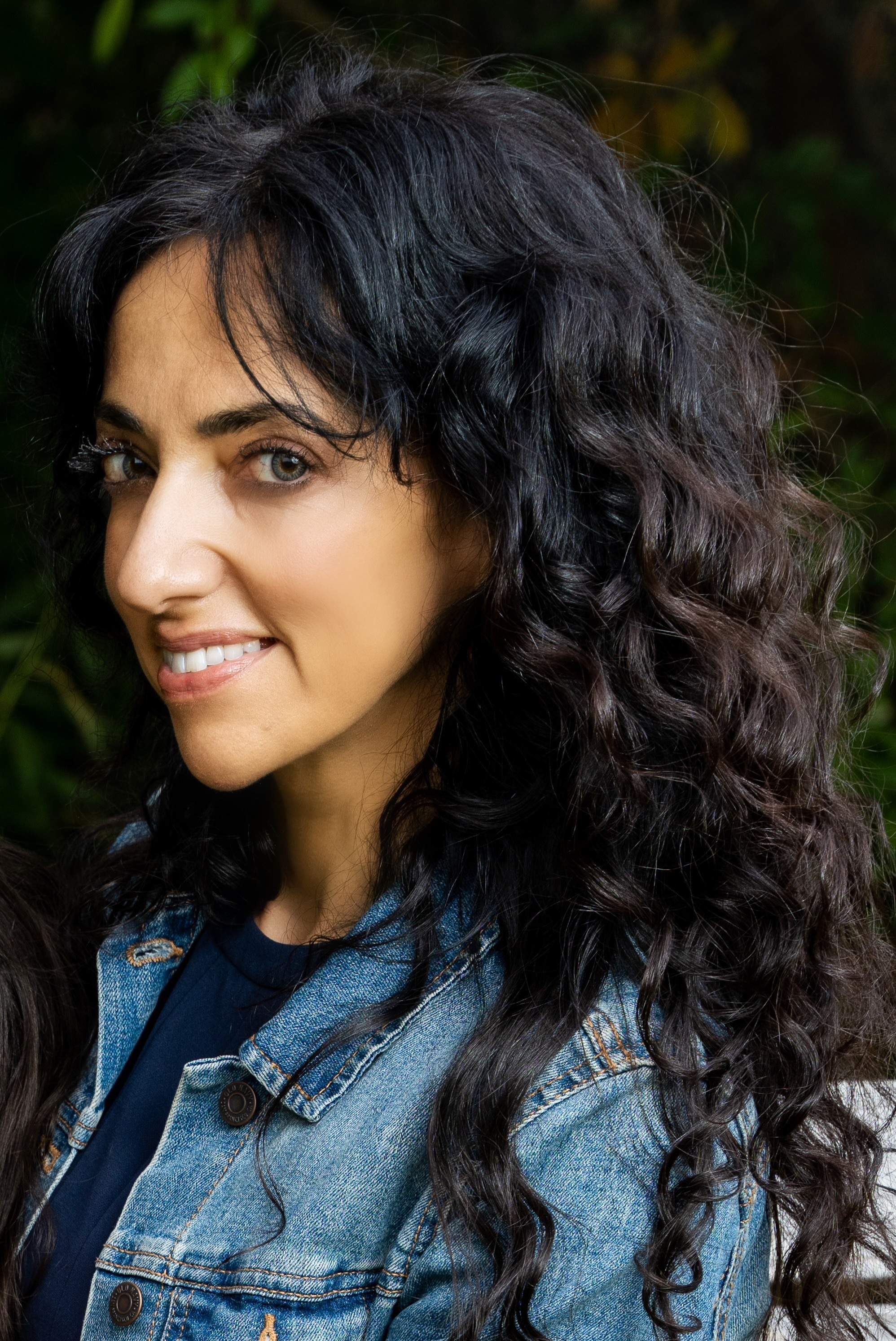
- Arraf in 2021
- Born: February 1976 (age 50); Detroit, Michigan, U.S.
- Education: University of Michigan (BA); American University (JD)
- Political party: Democratic
- Spouse: Adam Shapiro (m. 2002)

Huwaida Arraf (Arabic: هويدا عراف; born February 1976) is an American activist and lawyer who co-founded the International Solidarity Movement (ISM), a Palestinian-led organization using non-violent protests and international pressure to support Palestinians.

== Early life and education ==
Arraf was born in Detroit, Michigan, to two Palestinian Christian parents. Her mother is from the West Bank town of Beit Sahour and her father from Mi'ilya, a local council in Northern Israel. Under Israeli law, she has Israeli citizenship through her father, a Palestinian citizen of Israel. Her parents moved from the West Bank to Detroit to be able to raise her away from the violence in the West Bank. She and her parents were able to visit Palestine/Israel every few years until Arraf was ten years old.

Arraf triple majored in Arabic, Judaic studies, and political science at the University of Michigan. She spent a year at the Hebrew University in Jerusalem and studied Hebrew on a kibbutz. Arraf later earned a Juris Doctor from American University's Washington College of Law. Her focus was on international human rights and humanitarian law, with a particular interest in war crimes prosecution.

As a law student, Arraf conducted research for the Public International Law & Policy Group, which provides pro bono legal assistance to governments involved in conflicts. Arraf also worked with the International Human Rights Law Clinic at the Washington College of Law, where she represented clients before the Inter-American Commission on Human Rights on issues ranging from indigenous land rights to cross-border abductions and irregular rendition.

== Career ==
In the spring of 2000, Arraf traveled to Jerusalem to work as program coordinator for Seeds of Peace, a US-based nonprofit organization that seeks to foster dialogue between Jewish and Palestinian youth.

In 2001, Arraf worked at the Center for Coexistence in Jerusalem as a regional coordinator.

=== International Solidarity Movement ===
The International Solidarity Movement (ISM) is a Palestinian-led movement committed to resisting what it terms "the long-entrenched and systematic oppression and dispossession of the Palestinian population, using non-violent, direct-action methods and principles." In April 2001, while living in the occupied Palestinian territories, Arraf founded the ISM with members of the Holy Land Trust and the Rapprochement Centre to focus international attention on what it says is the oppression of the Palestinians. Since its creation, over 10,000 volunteers from dozens of countries have joined the ISM to monitor human rights abuses in occupied Palestine. In 2003 and 2004, the organization was nominated for the Nobel Peace Prize.

"The Palestinian Intifada, the 'uprising for freedom,' has got to be an international struggle...," Arraf says. "[It] is a struggle for freedom, a struggle for basic human dignity and human rights. Anyone who believes in freedom, believes in justice, believes in equality for all people not based on religion or nationality, can join in the struggle." Arraf co-authored the book Peace Under Fire: Israel, Palestine, and the International Solidarity Movement.

=== Gaza Freedom Flotilla ===
Arraf was the chair of the Free Gaza Movement, the organization behind the Gaza Freedom Flotillas, a series of groups of ships carrying pro-Palestinian activists that were organized to break Israel's naval blockade of the Gaza Strip. She was aboard the 2008 Free Gaza boats, as well as in the 2010 flotilla that was raided by Israeli commandos on May 31. Using a satellite phone on board, Arraf stated that their plan was to have the boats keep heading toward Gaza "until they either disable our boats or jump on board." At the time of the raid, Arraf was aboard the Challenger 1, one of the smallest boats (30 feet) of the flotilla. On Thursday, 3 June 2010, she provided her version of the events on Challenger 1 in an interview on Democracy Now.

Arraf resigned from her position in the Free Gaza Movement in October 2012, after a new board was approved on September 17, 2012. Her resignation came shortly before a controversy over an allegedly antisemitic tweet posted by Greta Berlin on the official Twitter feed of the Free Gaza Movement. Arraf called Berlin's tweet "offensive" but declined to answer a question put to her by Avi Mayer, a staffer at the Jewish Agency for Israel, about whether her departure was related to it.

In July 2025, Arraf joined a new Gaza Freedom Flotilla mission, organized amid the tightened Israeli blockade of the Gaza Strip during the Gaza war. Between 26 and 27 July, the IDF seized the ship, towed it to the Port of Ashdod, and detained the activists on board, vowing to deport them to their respective countries. Arraf, holding Israeli citizenship, was released upon interrogation without being deported.

=== Electoral politics ===
In November 2021, Arraf declared her candidacy for Michigan's 10th congressional district in the 2022 election. Arraf placed fourth in the five-way Democratic primary held in August 2022, losing the nomination to Carl Marlinga.

Arraf was a candidate for the Democratic nomination in the 2024 election to the University of Michigan Board of Regents, challenging Shauna Ryder-Diggs and incumbent Denise Ilitch for the nomination. She launched her campaign in August 2024, at the urging of students angered by the university's response to the pro-Palestinian protests. Arraf lost by roughly 100 district-weighted votes in the straw poll at the party convention. Many of her supporters protested when the results were announced due to a perceived lack of transparency in calculation. A lawsuit is currently pending in the Ingham County Circuit Court. A judge denied a request for injunctive relief to stop the Michigan Secretary of State from finalizing November 2024 ballots.

== Personal life ==
Arraf married Adam Shapiro, another ISM co-founder, in 2002. They met while both were working at the Jerusalem center of Seeds of Peace.
