= Osama Qashoo =

Palestinian activist and filmmaker (born 1981)

- Education: An-Najah National University; National Film and Television School
- Occupations: Human rights activist; filmmaker; entrepreneur
- Organizations: International Solidarity Movement; Free Gaza Movement; Palestine House
- Known for: Palestine activism

Osama Qashoo (Arabic: اسامة قشوع; born 3 August 1981) is a Palestinian human rights activist, filmmaker, and entrepreneur. He fled Palestine as a refugee to the United Kingdom in 2003. He switched from filmmaking to his involvement in Hiba restaurants, and created Gaza Cola in 2023 as a revenue stream to support Palestinians in Gaza affected by the Gaza war. He founded Palestine House, a London based cultural centre above Hiba Express, in 2024. He supports a Palestinian state through peaceful methods.

== Early life and education ==
Osama Qashoo studied engineering between 2000-2003 at An-Najah National University in Nablus in the West Bank, during which time the Second Intifada began; nobody was allowed to leave his village in the north of the West Bank, stopping his graduation plans. Qashoo has said that he found a broken VHS camera in the landfill around his village and filed it with stones, using it to pose as an Italian named Lorenzo and pretend to film a Japanese journalist who had been attacked by Israeli soldiers, causing them to release the journalist and getting a working camera from them as a token of gratitude.

In 2003, Qashoo was forced to flee Palestine after organising peaceful demonstrations against the separation wall, which he called the "apartheid wall", built by Israel inside the West Bank; he arrived in the United Kingdom as a refugee. His safe passage to the UK was organised by Dick Fontaine, head of the National Film and Television School documentary department. He has said that he lied that he was British and that his parents were wealthy in order to get in. While there from 2004 to 2005, he made a number of short documentaries; he directed the film My Olive Tree which in part persuaded the Trade Union Congress to organise the passage of Palestinian olive oil to Europe, bypassing Israel.

== Career ==
His trilogy, A Palestinian Journey, won the 2006 Al Jazeera New Horizon Award.

He wrote an opinion piece for The Guardian in 2008 titled "Intimidation will not stop our boats sailing for Gaza". In 2010, Qashoo helped organise the Gaza Freedom Flotilla, onboard the Turkish ship Mavi Marmara. Nine passengers on the Mavi Marmara were shot dead by Israeli soldiers in international waters. Qashoo was one of 682 detainees who were taken into Israeli custody after Israel attacked the boat; Qashoo lost his cameraman and filming equipment. He was tortured while detained, and was later deported to Turkey after his family went on a hunger strike due to a lack of information concerning his whereabouts.

He resettled in the UK, returning "homeless, with nothing." Finding it difficult to make a living from filmmaking though continuing with his activism, Qashoo co-founded the Palestinian restaurant Hiba Express in High Holborn, London, in 2012.

In mid-2024 Qashoo launched a £300,000 crowdfunding campaign to fund the development and completion of Palestine House, a five-storey centre celebrating Palestinian culture located on the site of a former language school at 113 High Holborn, London, above his restaurant, Hiba Express. He has stated that he rejected some funding from larger institutions, fearing they would "influence or control the narrative of [the] space."

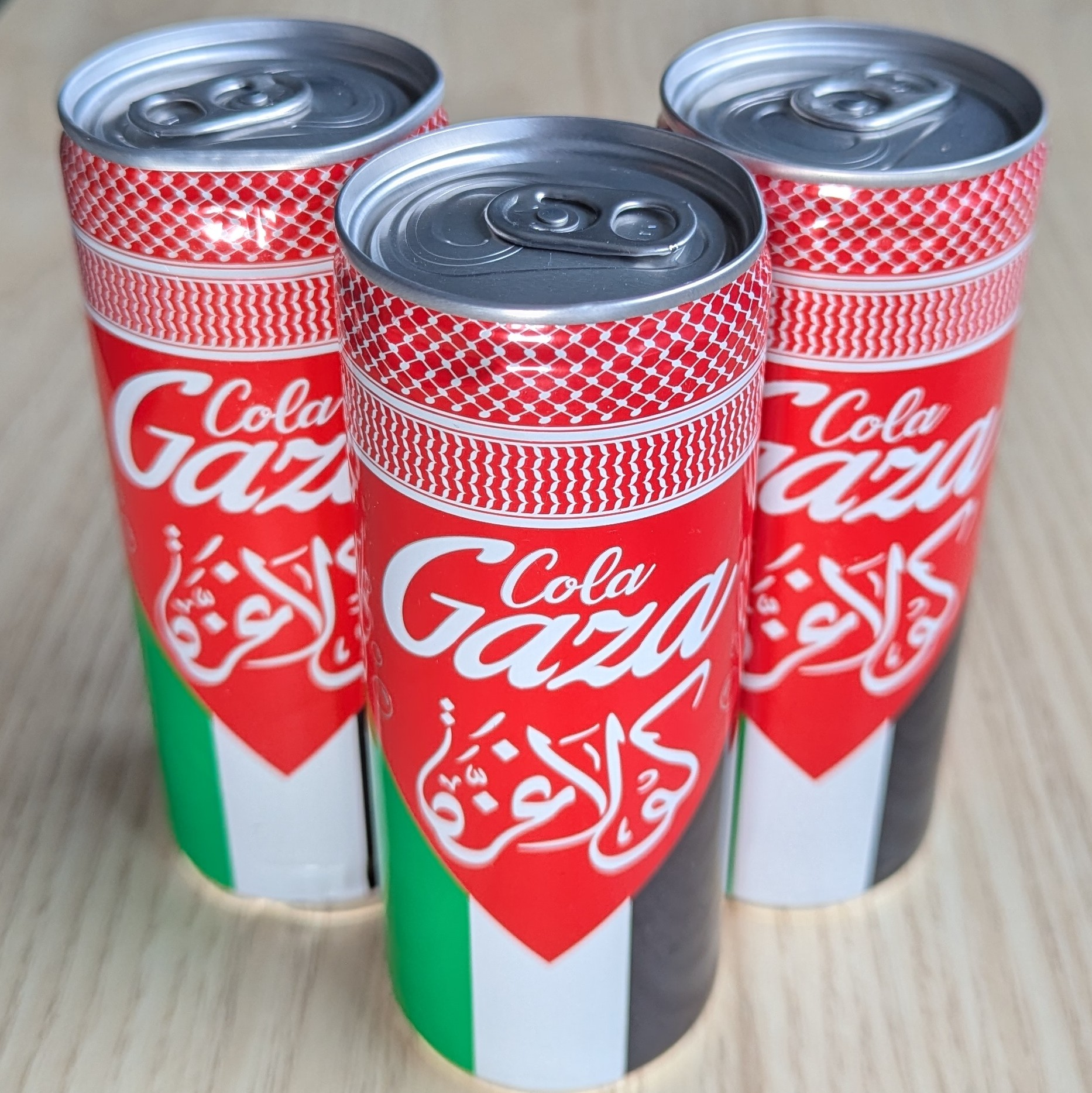
Qashoo's red cans of Gaza Cola feature the Palestinian flag, “Gaza Cola” written in English and Arabic calligraphy, and a Palestinian keffiyeh pattern.

In November 2023, Qashoo had the idea for Gaza Cola, an alternative to Coca-Cola, which operates facilities in the Israeli Atarot industrial settlement. He launched it in August 2024 in an effort to fund the rebuilding of the no-longer functional Al-Karama Hospital in northern Gaza, which he described as "reduced to rubble for no just reason, like all of these hospitals in Gaza." Qashoo said that he chose that hospital in particular due to its small size and thus relatively low amount of money needed to fund its rebuilding. Qashoo stated that the drink was "a statement to all these corporate companies who are investing in armed trade. To ask them the question of dignity. Do you see what your money’s doing? Because it is doing damage. It is destroying homes and our environment … they need to wake up and they need to understand that their money, their greed, is causing our genocide." Due to the politics behind the drink it could not be sold in large stores, so Qashoo persuaded Hiba Express and other Palestinian restaurants to sell it. Qashoo has said that the drink sold more than 500,000 units by the end of 2024.

== Filmography ==
- Inside Outside (2004), director
- My Dear Olive Tree (2004), director – created at the National Film and Television School
- No Choice Basis (2005), director
- Soy Palestino (2007), director
- Samir's Room (2011), director – shot in Syria and Jerusalem, and inspired by the issue of illegal occupation of family homes in East Jerusalem

== Personal life ==
Qashoo has an adopted son in the West Bank, who was shot in the head in June. As of November 2024, the whereabouts of this 17-year-old are not known.
