= Tawhid al-Jihad (Gaza Strip) =

Sunni Islamist Palestinian group

Jahafil Al-Tawhid Wal-Jihad fi Filastin
- (Arabic: جحافل التوحيد والجهاد في فلسطين)
- The Shahada flag commonly used by al-Qaeda.
- Leader: Abu Walid al-Maqdisi † (5 February 2011 – 13 October 2012)
- Dates active: 6 November 2008 – 2012
- Active regions: Gaza Strip, and sometimes in the Sinai
- Ideology: Salafist jihadism Wahhabism
- Wars: the Gaza–Israel conflict and the Global War on Terrorism

Jahafil Al-Tawhid Wal-Jihad fi Filastin (Arabic: جحافل التوحيد والجهاد في فلسطين, "The Armies of Monotheism and Jihad in Palestine") was a Sunni Islamist Palestinian group in the Gaza Strip and the Sinai Peninsula. The establishment of the group was publicly announced on 6 November 2008, with communiqués vowing loyalty to al-Qaeda, after having "received the messages of Osama bin Laden and Ayman Al-Zawahiri." Various forms of the "Tawhid al-Jihad" label have appeared in relation to developments in the Gaza Strip. The size of the group is not publicly known. The group have no reported attack since 2012 and is considered as defunct.

== 2006 Dahab bombings ==
Terrorists involved in the April 2006 Dahab bombings in Egypt confessed to Egyptian officials that they had been trained in the Gaza Strip and that they belonged to an organization called al-Tawhid wal-Jihad. An analysis published by the Jerusalem Center for Public Affairs commented on this development that al-Qaeda-related groups in the Gaza Strip had become involved in military operations, the backdrop being repeated calls by al-Qaeda deputy chief Ayman al-Zawahiri to export military operations from the war in Iraq to other countries in the area.

== Fatwa allowing the killing of noncombatants ==
On 5 February 2011, the leader of a Gazan jihadist group calling itself Jama'at Al-Tawhid Wal-Jihad, Sheikh 'Ahed Ahmad 'Abd Al-Karim Al-Sa'idani, a.k.a. Abu al-Walid al-Maqdisi, posted a fatwa stating that Jews and Christians may be targeted in lethal attacks such as those of 9/11 because they are "aggressive combatants" and "fundamentally not innocent". The fatwa also stated that it is not permissible to refrain from such attacks for fear of hurting Muslims, "because this would mean stopping the jihad". On March 2, 2011 al-Maqdisi was arrested by Hamas. He was released in August 2012 but was killed in an Israeli airstrike two months later.

== Rocket attacks on Israel ==
In April 2011, according to the Ma'an News Agency, several new militant groups emerged in the Gaza Strip and for the first time claimed responsibility for some concurrent Palestinian rocket attacks on Israel. One of these groups, identified as At-Tawhid and Al-Jihad – Beit Al-Maqdis, claimed responsibility for firing a rocket at Nahal Oz.

At the same time, SITE reported that the Gazan militant group Tawhid and Jihad Group in Jerusalem released a video on 10 April depicting a purported rocket attack on Nahal Oz. The video depicted masked gunmen setting up, and firing the rocket, and was released as part of a series accompanied by quotes from Abu Musab al-Zarqawi encouraging jihad, as well as a statement expressing the hope of "strengthening the determination and energizing the Mujahideen brothers to do their best in fighting of the enemies of Allah, the Jews."

On 13 April, Ma'an reported that Gazan militant group Tawhid and Jihad claimed to have launched two missiles at Nirim, an Israeli kibbutz. The group said its claimed attack was "a response to Israeli aggression on the Gaza Strip", without clarifying further. However, the Israel Defense Forces said they were not aware of a rocket attack taking place at that time.

== Kidnapping and murder of Vittorio Arrigoni ==
On 11 April 2011, a Gazan terrorist group named Tawhid wal-Jihad or Tawhid and Jihad (literally "monotheism and Jihad") announced that it had kidnapped Vittorio Arrigoni (age 36), an Italian peace activist, blogger and occasional freelance journalist, in the Gaza Strip. It threatened to execute him unless Hamas released its leader, Hesham al-Sa'eedni, by 5 pm the following day. Hamas, which is the elected majority party and governs the Gaza Strip, had imprisoned al-Sa'eedni the previous month. Some Israel allies countries, like the European Union, the United States and others, designate Hamas itself as a terrorist group, while nations such as China, Russia, Syria, Turkey, Norway and Switzerland do not.

Arrigoni was a pacifist supporter of the Palestinian cause, a member of the Palestinian-led International Solidarity Movement, and held a blog reporting from the Gaza Strip. He had been living in the territory since arriving on one of the first flotillas to Gaza in 2008.

Tawhid wal-Jihad released a video to YouTube calling their captive "Victor, an Italian journalist" and demanding the release of global jihadists, including supporters of the group. Set to Arabic music, the footage showed Arrigoni blindfolded, with tied hands and blood around his right eye, held roughly by the hair. The captor was hidden with only his outstretched arm visible. Arabic text in the clip described Italy as "the infidel state" and said that "the Italian hostage entered our land only to spread corruption". The video was similar to others released by other extremists in Iraq and Afghanistan.

Arrigoni was found dead well before the deadline. Hamas said it had stormed a house where they thought Arrigoni was being held, fought with the abductors, and then found his body, hanged. Hamas condemned the killing and said it had made two arrests. The Los Angeles Times commented that

[T]he kidnapping raised questions about Hamas' control over Gaza, and it represents the latest example of how smaller, more radical groups in the territory—some with alleged ties to Al Qaeda—are challenging the rule of Hamas, which itself is viewed by Israel and the United States as a terrorist organization. Those groups complain that Hamas has become too moderate.

Following Arrigoni's murder, Hamas launched a successful crackdown on Tawhid al-Jihad.

== See also ==
- Islamist anti-Hamas groups in the Gaza Strip
- Army of Islam (Gaza Strip)
- Jund Ansar Allah
