= Elinor Joseph =

First female Arab Christian soldier in an Israeli combat position

Elinor Joseph آلينور جوزف אלינור ג'וזף
- Born: 1991 (age 34–35); Jish, Israel
- Military career
- Allegiance: Israel
- Branch: Combat Medic, Medical Corps
- Service years: April 2009 –
- Units: Caracal Battalion, Infantry Corps

External image
- Elinor Joseph in uniform—IDF Spokesperson

Elinor Joseph (Arabic: آلينور جوزف, Hebrew: אלינור ג'וזף; born 1991 in Jish, Israel) is an Israeli-Arab soldier who has served with the Caracal Battalion of the Israel Defense Forces (IDF) since 2010. She became the first Arab woman ever to serve in a combat role in the Israeli military.

== Background ==
Joseph was born into a Christian family from the Christian village of Jish (Gush Halav) in northern Israel. Her parents are Charbel and Warda Joseph and she has an older sister, Lauren. Charbel served in the Israeli Paratroopers Brigade. The Joseph family later relocated to the Arab neighborhood of Wadi Nisnas in Haifa.

== Military service ==
=== Enlistment and training ===
When Joseph graduated high school, her father encouraged her to enlist in the IDF. Though initially opposed to the idea, she gradually cottoned to it and cultivated an ambition to serve as a combat medic. However, upon arriving at the recruitment base, she was informed that she had already been ordained to serve as an office clerk. Deeply disappointed, Joseph refused to be transported out to a new base, until finally, after several days, a meeting was arranged between her and a colonel from the Northern Command. The colonel made her a singular proposal: undergo regular basic training and, on the condition of being selected as an outstanding trainee, go on to attempt the medic's training course.

Joseph agreed and completed basic training, was the outstanding trainee of her platoon, and subsequently proceeded to the medic's training course. In an interview with Gadi Sukenik of Channel 2, Joseph described the course as "one of the most... amazing experiences I ever had." At the completion ceremony, on account of her being an outstanding cadet, her commander awarded her her own medic's pin.

=== Tours of duty ===
After successfully completing the medic's training course, Joseph was stationed in a military police base near the Palestinian city of Qalqilyah. In an interview with Chen Kotas Bar of Ma'ariv she recounted how soldiers there would summon her whenever a problem arose with the local residents and there was need for an interpreter. She had some misgivings about serving at a border crossing, but in those moments she reminded herself of the Katyusha rockets that rained down on Haifa. "If someone would tell me that serving in the IDF means killing Arabs, I remind them that Arabs also kill Arabs," she told Rotem Caro Weizman of the IDF Spokesperson's Unit.

In response to a transfer request made by Joseph, in 2010 she was reassigned to the Caracal battalion, which operates in the western Negev along Israel's border with Egypt. She thus became the first Arab woman ever to serve in the Israeli army in a combat role.

=== Reactions ===
Joseph described the reactions of her friends and neighbors as mixed. While she encountered no overt hostility, walking around her neighborhood in the IDF uniform drew cross looks from some passersby. Some of Joseph's friends terminated contact with her, while with others she developed a closer relationship.

Arab-Israeli journalist Suleiman al-Shafi has denied that Joseph is the first Arab woman to serve in a combat role in the IDF. In his view, it is more accurate to describe her as the first to have done so publicly.

== See also ==
- Amira al-Hayb
- Lucy Aharish
- Sherut Leumi
- Women in the Israel Defense Forces
