= Taysir Hayb =

Israeli soldier convicted of manslaughter

- تيسير الهيب
- Occupation: Israel Defense Forces soldier
- Status: Released
- Convictions: Manslaughter; Obstruction of justice
- Penalty: 8 years imprisonment

Idier Wahid Taysir Hayb (or al-Heib) (Arabic: تيسير الهيب; Hebrew: תייסיר אל-היב) is a Bedouin Israeli sergeant, convicted of manslaughter, who shot British International Solidarity Movement civilian activist Tom Hurndall, while on duty in Gaza on 11 April 2003. Hurndall died in January 2004, after a nine-month coma. Hayb was sentenced to eight years for manslaughter. His sentence was reduced in July 2010, and he was released after only five years. He is the brother of Amira al Hayb, the first Bedouin Israeli female to join the IDF.

== Investigation and trial ==
Initially, Hayb claimed he had shot at a man in military fatigues, who was firing at soldiers. However, photographic evidence clearly showed that Hurndall was wearing a bright orange jacket, denoting he was a foreigner. Hayb was an award-winning marksman and his rifle had a telescopic sight. He said he aimed 100 mm (4 in) from Hurndall's head, 'but he moved'. Hayb, allegedly, claimed a policy of shooting at unarmed civilians existed at the time.

In May 2004, Taysir Hayb went on trial for manslaughter in the death of Tom Hurndall, obstruction of justice and unbecoming behaviour. In August 2005, he was convicted of manslaughter and obstruction of justice and sentenced to 8 years in prison.

== Release ==
Hayb was to be released in August 2010, after an army committee headed by Advocate-General Avichai Mandelblit decided to shorten his sentence due to good behaviour.

The army committee dismissed arguments from military prosecutors that the early release could harm relations between Israel and the United Kingdom, and said he "no longer posed any threat to society in their view."

Hayb was finally released on 8 September 2010, after having served six-and-a-half years of his sentence.
