= Brian Avery (activist) =

American activist (born 1979)

- Born: 1979 (age 46–47); Connecticut, U.S.
- Occupation: Activist

Brian Avery (born 1979) is an American who, while volunteering for the International Solidarity Movement (ISM) in the West Bank town of Jenin, was shot in the face by Israel Defense Forces on April 5, 2003. The shooting, which according to Human Rights Watch was "unprovoked and did not occur in the context of any apparent hostilities", caused Avery to suffer permanent disfigurement.

== Early life ==
Avery was born in Connecticut, the youngest of three children. His father served 30 years in the United States Navy, and his mother is a schoolteacher. He attended school in Chapel Hill, North Carolina, and enrolled in the University of North Carolina at Greensboro to study music. He dropped out after a year to play in a rock band for two years, then worked on communal organic farms in North Carolina, France, Spain, and Portugal.

He lived for a year in a housing cooperative in Chicago, and later became associated with the Arab-Jewish Peace Alliance in Albuquerque, New Mexico, where he came into contact with the ISM. Shortly thereafter, in January 2003, he traveled to the West Bank to participate in ISM protests against Israel.

== Shooting incident ==
In a February 2005 interview, he said:

[W]e weren't two blocks from our apartment when an Israeli convoy of two vehicles, a tank and an armored personnel carrier, drove up the street from the direction that we were walking from. And so as we heard them coming closer, we stepped off to the side of the road to let them pass by, which was again, you know, a very, very typical situation for us to encounter the soldiers, even during the curfew, and for them just to pass on by ... And so we stood to the side of the road, we put our hands out to show we didn't have any weapons and weren't, you know, threatening them in any way. And I was wearing a fluorescent vest to, you know, try to make ourselves as visible as possible. And once they drove within about 30 meters of where we were standing, they opened fire with their machine guns and continued shooting for a very long time, probably shooting about, you know, 30 rounds of ammunition, which is quite a lot when you see them in action. And I was struck in the face with one of the bullets and, you know, was knocked to the ground immediately.

Avery was hit in the face, his cheek was torn and his eye socket and jaw bones were smashed. The bullet entered at his right tear duct, completely destroying his nasal bone, and exiting his left cheek. His lower left jaw had been sheared in half, and he lost half the teeth on the top left side of his mouth. After three months of hospitalization, Avery found that he would still hear an echo in his skull whenever he spoke. He was left without a sense of smell, or the ability to breathe through his nose. In the first year subsequent to the incident, he endured over six rounds of surgery in which bone was removed from his skull to help reconstruct his face. Because he did not have (affordable) health insurance, being shot in the face created an enormous financial burden for his family.

According to The Jerusalem Post (9/20/07; 11/19/08), Brian and his associates were "wearing red reflector vests with the word "doctor" in English and Arabic." The army refused to order a formal investigation of the incident, since that their probe found that no soldiers on patrol in the area that night reported such an incident as it was described by the four witnesses.

== Israeli Supreme Court hearing ==
Avery appeared before the Israeli Supreme Court on February 28, 2005 to request a criminal investigation into his shooting. He accused Israeli troops of shooting him without provocation. The court responded by ordering the military to reopen Avery's case. Avery's attorney, Michael Sfard, said that the ruling "shows the military that even internal inquiries should be managed professionally and with care to get testimony from all sides, not just from military," and that it "coerces the military to change its stand on things. This is definitely not usual."

== Out-of-court settlement ==
In November 2008, Avery accepted a settlement for NIS 600,000 (US$150,000) from the state of Israel in exchange for dropping the lawsuit. According to Shlomo Lecker, his Israeli lawyer, "The sum does not reflect the injuries Avery suffered... On the other hand, it's one of the very few times the state has awarded damages to anyone hurt by the IDF during the Second Intifada." Lecker said that Avery was willing to settle because of the need to defray some of the costs of the reconstructive operations he must still undergo, in addition to skepticism that the 15-month-long investigation would ever reach a satisfactory conclusion.

== See also ==
- James Miller
- Tom Hurndall
- Rachel Corrie
- Vittorio Arrigoni
- Ayşenur Ezgi Eygi
