= Tom Hurndall =

British activist (1981–2004)

Thomas Hurndall
- Born: 27 November 1981; London, England
- Died: 13 January 2004 (aged 22); London, England
- Cause of death: Gunshot wound
- Occupations: Photography student, peace activist

Thomas Hurndall (27 November 1981 – 13 January 2004) was a British photography student, a volunteer for the International Solidarity Movement (ISM), and an activist against the Israeli occupation of the Palestinian territories. On 11 April 2003, he was shot in the Gaza Strip by an Israeli IDF sniper, Taysir Hayb. Hurndall was left in a coma and died nine months later.

Hayb was convicted of manslaughter and obstruction of justice by an Israeli military court in April 2005 and sentenced to eight years in prison. On 10 April 2006, a British inquest jury returned a verdict of unlawful killing.

Tom's mother Jocelyn Hurndall has written a biography of him called Defy the Stars: The Life and Tragic Death of Tom Hurndall, published in April 2007 and reprinted in May 2008 with the alternative title My Son Tom: The Life and Tragic Death of Tom Hurndall. His sister, Sophie, works for Medical Aid for Palestinians.

== Student turns activist ==
Hurndall was educated at Winchester College, a boarding independent school in Winchester in England.

Aged 21, Tom Hurndall took a working break from his degree course at Manchester Metropolitan University in photographic journalism to join the "human shields" in Iraq before the 2003 Iraq War. As the volunteers ran out of money and war became inevitable, he moved to Jordan and donated £500 to medical supplies for refugees from Iraq. It was here that he encountered the International Solidarity Movement (ISM), and decided to make his way overland to Gaza. He arrived in the town of Rafah on 6 April 2003 and began emailing images of the Israel Defense Forces (IDF) and the Palestinians back to his family. His Guardian obituary states that "the tone of his journals changed dramatically" and he justified his new location with "No one could say I wasn't seeing what needs to be seen now".

What do I want from this life? What makes you happy is not enough. All the things that satisfy our instincts only satisfy the animal in us. I want to be proud of myself. I want more. I want to look up to myself and when I die, I want to smile because of the things I have done, not cry for the things I haven't done.

— Tom Hurndall

== Death ==
In April 2003, the IDF were on a mission in the Gaza border town of Rafah. Hurndall and a group of activists were in the area, having planned to set up a peace tent on one of the nearby roads to blockade IDF tank patrols. Hurndall was shot in the head on 11 April 2003. According to the IDF, an Israeli checkpoint came under fire from Palestinian militants, and the soldiers at the checkpoint returned fire. Hurndall's group of nine activists abandoned their protest to seek cover. Hurndall then ran out into the street to save two children and was shot in the head by an IDF soldier. He was taken to a Palestinian hospital in Rafah, and was declared clinically dead. The IDF transferred him to Israel, and he was taken to Soroka Medical Center in Beersheba, where he was kept on a ventilator and underwent surgery. Six weeks after the surgery, he was flown back to the United Kingdom, where he was taken to the Royal Hospital for Neuro-disability in London, where he remained in a persistent vegetative state, suffering from irreversible brain damage. He died on 13 January 2004, after nine months in a coma.

His father told a British inquest that, according to ISM and Palestinian witnesses, Hurndall had seen a group of children playing and had noticed that bullets were hitting the ground between them. Several children had run away but some were "paralysed with fear" and Hurndall went to help them. Hurndall's father told the inquest: "Tom went to take one girl out of the line of fire, which he did successfully, but when he went back, as he knelt down [to collect another], he was shot."

== Israeli inquiry and trial ==
The IDF initially refused more than a routine internal inquiry, which concluded that Hurndall was shot accidentally in the crossfire, and suggested that his group's members were essentially functioning as human shields. However, witnesses at the demonstration in the Palestinian town of Rafah said he had been hit by a rifle bullet while trying to shield the children rather than having been merely hit in the crossfire, and Hurndall's parents demanded an investigation.

=== Investigation as a result of pressure ===
As pressure from the parents mounted, supported in part by British Foreign Secretary Jack Straw, in October 2003 Israel's Judge Advocate General Menachem Finkelstein ordered the IDF to open a further military police investigation into Hurndall's death.

=== Taysir Hayb's early testimony ===
Idier Wahid Taysir Hayb (or al-Heib) claimed he had shot at a man in military fatigues although photographic evidence clearly showed Hurndall was wearing a bright orange jacket denoting he was a foreigner. Hayb was an award-winning marksman and his rifle had a telescopic sight. He claimed to have aimed four inches from Hurndall's head, "but he moved". Hayb said a policy of shooting at unarmed civilians existed at the time.

=== Autopsy report ===
The defence in the trial of Sergeant Hayb attempted to raise doubts as to what ultimately caused Hurndall's death. A military court was informed that Hurndall died of pneumonia. Chen Kugel, an Israeli forensic pathologist appearing for the defence, stated that the pneumonia had not been properly treated and "the large amounts of morphine" Hurndall was receiving contributed to his death. The court rejected these claims.

=== Hayb's change of testimony ===
On 1 January 2004, Sergeant Hayb, a 20-year-old IDF soldier, appeared in court to have his custody extended. Apparently he had been arrested in late December 2003 and an IDF press release said that he had "admitted to firing in proximity to an unarmed civilian as a deterrent". Initially the soldier admitted to shooting what he described as a man wearing a uniform of a Palestinian faction and armed with a pistol. Upon further interrogation, he changed his story, and said he had fired a shot near an unarmed civilian as a deterrent, but ended up hitting him unintentionally.

=== Indictments ===
After his changed testimony, the soldier was indicted on six charges, including a charge of aggravated assault. Following Hurndall's death, the military judge overseeing the case indicated the charge was likely to be changed to manslaughter or murder.

On 12 February 2004, the charge was upgraded to one of manslaughter. According to an army statement, he was also charged with "intent to cause injury, two counts of obstruction of justice, one count of submitting false information, one count of incitement to submit false information and one count of conduct unbecoming."

On 10 May 2004, Sergeant Hayb's trial began at a military court in Ashkelon. There were six indictments: manslaughter; two counts of obstruction of justice; incitement to false testimony; false testimony; improper conduct. Hayb had entered a plea of "Not Guilty" to all charges at an earlier non-public hearing. After some argument over the admissibility of Hayb's confession, the trial was adjourned until 19 May 2004. The trial remained adjourned for much of the time leading up to early August 2004.

=== Verdict ===
On 27 June 2005, Hayb was convicted of manslaughter, obstruction of justice, giving false testimony and inducing comrades in his unit to bear false witness; on 11 August 2005, he was sentenced to eleven and a half years for manslaughter by a military court, of which he was to serve eight years in prison. In August 2010, an army committee headed by Advocate-General Avichai Mandelblit shortened Hayb's sentence for good behaviour, resulting in his serving a total of six and a half years in custody.

=== Military police report access denial ===
Tom Hurndall's family and their legal team were denied access to the military police report which led to the trial. After an appeal to the Israeli Supreme Court, in early August the state prosecution offered the legal team access to the report, but not to the Hurndall family themselves. According to a spokesman for the Tom Hurndall Foundation, this will allow them to decide whether Hayb could be indicted for the more serious charge of murder, and to find out if responsibility for Hurndall's death lies higher up the chain of command.

== Coroner's inquest ==
On 10 April 2006, an English inquest jury at St Pancras coroner's court in London found that Hurndall had been "unlawfully killed". Hurndall's father told reporters that there had been a "general policy" to shoot civilians in the area without fear of reprisals, as stated by the soldier who fired the shot, Taysir Hayb. Hayb had earlier told a military tribunal that the Israeli army "fires freely in Rafah." The lawyer representing the family, Michael Mansfield QC, stated:

Make no mistake about it, the Israeli defence force have today been found culpable by this jury of murder.

A week earlier, an inquest found that the British journalist James Miller had been killed by an Israeli soldier just three weeks after Mr. Hurndall was shot, a mile away from Hurndall's position. The coroner Dr. Andrew Reid stated that he would write to the Attorney General about how similar incidents could be prevented, including the possible prosecutions of Israeli commanders, and that the case raised issues of command within the IDF. He stated that "two British citizens engaged in lawful activities" had been killed by Israeli soldiers, and that "British citizens, journalists, photographers or others may be subject to the risk of fatal shots."

== Media ==
Tom's mother Jocelyn Hurndall wrote a commentary in The Guardian on 10 January 2004, in which she stated:

It seems that life is cheap in the occupied territories. Different value attached to life depends on whether the victim happens to be Israeli, international or Palestinian.

== Documentaries ==
On 13 October 2008, Channel 4 broadcast a dramatised documentary The Shooting of Thomas Hurndall, which was written by Simon Block and directed by Rowan Joffe. Stephen Dillane plays Anthony Hurndall and Kerry Fox plays Jocelyn Hurndall. Anthony and Jocelyn Hurndall were interviewed at length in The Observer prior to the airing of the documentary:

They shot our son but they can't kill his spirit.

— Anthony and Jocelyn Hurndall

The Shooting of Thomas Hurndall was nominated for the 2009 British Academy Television Award for Best Single Drama (Simon Block, Rowan Joffe, Barney Reisz, Charles Furneaux) and won Best Actor (Stephen Dillane) and Best Director Fiction/Entertainment (Rowan Joffe). At the Monte Carlo TV Festival Rowan Joffe won Golden Nymph 2009 as Best Director in a TV Film.

== Artistic tributes ==
Tom Hurndall memorialised in the second movement (Dance for Tom Hurndall (no lyrics)) of US composer Philip Munger's 2003 cantata The Skies are Weeping. The cantata is titled after Thushara Wijeratna's poem which is set to music in the sixth of the seven movements. The cantata is written for a soprano soloist, chamber choir, and percussion ensemble, and is written in memory of Rachel Corrie, an American member of the International Solidarity Movement killed in 2003 by a bulldozer operated by the Israel Defence Forces while she tried to prevent a house demolition in the southern Gaza Strip during the Second Intifada.

== Memorial lectures ==
Since 2005, an annual Memorial Lecture has been held at Manchester Metropolitan University. Speakers have included Salman Abu-Sitta, Ilan Pappé, Avi Shlaim, Karma Nabulsi, Eyal Weizman, Adam Hanieh, Penny Green, Miriyam Aouragh, Rabab Abdulhadi and several others. The lectures from 2005 to 2021 have been published in the collection For Palestine: Essays from the Tom Hurndall Memorial Lecture Group.

== See also ==
- Iain Hook – British military officer and aid worker for UNRWA killed by IDF sniper in the West Bank, 22 November 2002.
- James Miller – British filmmaker fatally shot in Gaza by IDF sniper, 2 May 2003.
- Rachel Corrie – American ISM volunteer killed by Israeli bulldozer in Gaza, 16 March 2003.
- Brian Avery – American ISM volunteer shot and severely disfigured in Jenin, 5 April 2003.
- Ayşenur Ezgi Eygi – Turkish-American ISM volunteer who, like Hurndall, was shot in the head by an Israeli sniper in the West Bank, 6 September 2024
