= Sinan Antoon =

Iraqi poet, novelist, scholar, and literary translator

- سنان أنطون
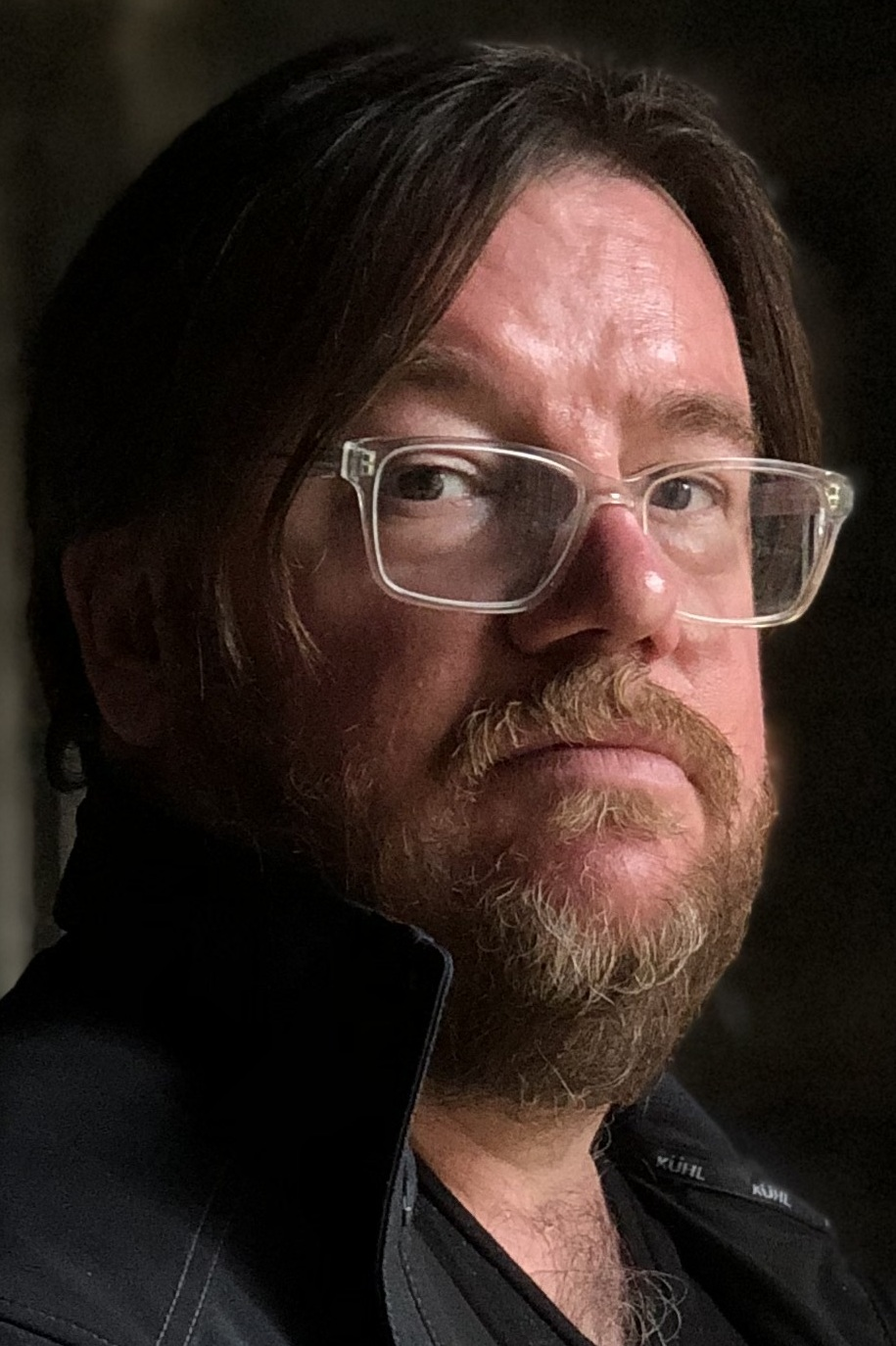
- Sinan Antoon in Mosul, February 2019
- Born: 1967 (age 58–59); Baghdad, Iraqi Republic
- Occupations: Associate Professor, novelist, poet
- Website: sinanantoon.com

Sinan Antoon (Arabic: سنان أنطون) is an Iraqi poet, novelist, scholar, and literary translator. He has been described as "one of the most acclaimed authors of the Arab world." Alberto Manguel described him as "one of the great fiction writers of our time.” He is an associate professor at the Gallatin School of Individualized Study at New York University.

== Life and career ==
Antoon was born in 1967 in Baghdad. He received his B.A. in English with distinction from the University of Baghdad in 1990 with minors in Arabic and translation. He left Iraq in 1991 after the onset of the Gulf War and moved to the United States. He completed an M.A. in Arab Studies from Georgetown University in 1995. In 2006, he received his Ph.D. from Harvard University in Arabic and Islamic Studies. His doctoral dissertation was the first study on the 10th century poet, Ibn al-Hajjaj and the genre of poetry he pioneered (sukhf).

"He was one of a coterie of dissident diasporic Iraqi intellectuals who opposed the 2003 US occupation of his homeland that led to the current post-colonial quagmire." Antoon was featured in the 2003 documentary film About Baghdad, which he also co-directed and co-produced.

His articles have appeared in The Guardian, The New York Times, The Nation, and in pan-Arab dailies including al-Hayat, al-Akhbar, as-Safir, and al-Quds al-Arabi where he writes a biweekly opinion column.

His poems and novels have been translated into thirteen different languages. He is also a co-founder and co-editor of the e-zine Jadaliyya.

== Literary works ==
=== Poetry ===
Antoon has published two collections of poetry in Arabic: Laylun Wahidun fi Kull al-Mudun (One Night in All Cities) (Beirut: Dar al-Jamal, 2010) and Kama fi al-Sama (Beirut: Dar al-Jamal, 2020). He has published two collections in English;The Baghdad Blues (Harbor Mountain Press, 2006) and Postcards from the Underworld (Seagull Books, 2023).

=== Novels ===
Antoon has published five novels:

- I`jaam (Beirut: Dar al-Adab, 2002 and later al-Jamal, 2014) was widely acclaimed in the Arab world and described as "the Iraqi novel par excellence." It was translated to English by Rebecca Johnson and the author as I`jaam: An Iraqi Rhapsody and published by CityLights Books in 2006. Other translations include German (Irakische Rhapsodie (Lenos), Norwegian, Italian, and Portuguese.
- 'Wahdaha Shajarat al-Rumman (The Pomegranate Alone) (Beirut: Dar al-Jamal, 2010) was translated by the author and published by Yale University Press in 2013 as The Corpse Washer and was longlisted for the Independent Prize for Foreign Fiction. It won the 2014 Saif Ghobash Banipal Prize for Literary Translation. The Argentinian writer Alberto Manguel described as "one of the most extraordinary novels he's read in a long time." The French translation (Seul le Grenadier) was published by Actes Sud in 2017 and won the 2017 Prix de la Littérature Arabe for the best Arabic novel translated to French in 2017. Its translation in Malayalam language in the title Vellaputhappikkunnavar was done by Dr. Shamnad N, Head of the department, University College, Trivandrum, Kerala.
- Ya Maryam (Ave Maria) (Beirut: Dar al-Jamal, 2012) was shortlisted for the International Prize for Arabic Fiction (The Arabic Booker) and was translated to Spanish by María Luz Comendador and published by Turner Libros in May 2014 under the title Fragmentos de Bagdad. The English translation (by Maia Tabet) was published in 2017 as The Baghdad Eucharist by Hoopoe Books (AUC Press).
- Fihris (Index) (Beirut: Dar al-Jamal, 2016). Was longlisted for the International Prize for Arabic Fiction. It was translated by Jonathan Wright into English and published by Yale University Press in 2020 as The Book of Collateral Damage.
- Khuzama (Lavender) (Beirut: Dar al-Jamal, 2023). A novel about two Iraqi refugees living in the United States. One fled dictatorship in the 1990s and the other fled the post-2003 sectarian ethnic cleansing. It was translated to Persian by Mohammad Hazbae Zadeh and published by Ofoq. It was also translated into French and published by Actes Sud.

== Honors and awards ==
- 2017 Prix de la Litterature Arabe for "Seul le Grenadier" (Actes Sud, 2017, tr. Leila Mansur) (Wahdaha Shajarat al-Rumman/The Corpse Washer).
- 2017 "Fihris"(Index) longlisted for the International Prize for Arabic Fiction.
- 2016/2017: Fellow at the Wissenschaftskolleg zu Berlin (Institute of Advanced Study in Berlin).
- 2014: Saif Ghobash Prize for Literary Translation for his translation of his own novel The Corpse Washer (The first self-translation to win the prize.)
- 2014: Arab American Book Award for The Corpse Washer
- 2014: Lannan Residency (Marfa, TX).
- 2013:Ya Maryam (Ave Maria) shortlisted for the 2013 International Prize of Arabic Fiction (The Arabic Booker)
- 2013: Berlin Prize Fellow at the American Academy in Berlin
- 2012: National Translation Award for his translation of Mahmoud Darwish's In the Presence of Absence from the American Literary Translators Association
- 2008: Postdoctoral Fellowship: EUME (Europe in the Middle East/The Middle East in Europe), Berlin, Germany.
- 2002: Mellon Fellowship for Dissertation Research in Original Sources.

== Works ==
Books

- The Poetics of the Obscene: Ibn al-Hajjaj and Sukhf. Harvard University Press. 2006.
- The Baghdad Blues. Harbor Mountain Press. 2007. ISBN 9780978600945.
- I'jaam: An Iraqi Rhapsody. City Lights Books. 2007. ISBN 978-0-87286-457-3.
- Ya Maryam (Ave Maria). Dar al-Jamal. 2012.
- The Corpse Washer. Yale University Press. 30 July 2013. ISBN 978-0-300-19505-7.
- The Baghdad Eucharist. Oxford University Press. 2017. ISBN 9789774168208.
- The Book of Collateral Damage. Yale University Press. 28 May 2019. ISBN 9780300244854.

Film

- About Baghdad

== See also ==
- Iraqi art
- List of Iraqi artists
