= The Perfect Famine =

- Directed by: Steve Bradshaw; Christopher Walker
- Release date: 15 September 2002
- Running time: 28 min.
- Country: United Kingdom
- Language: English

The Perfect Famine is a 2002 British documentary film directed by Steve Bradshaw and Christopher Walker.
