= Caoimhe Butterly =

Irish activist (born 1977/78)

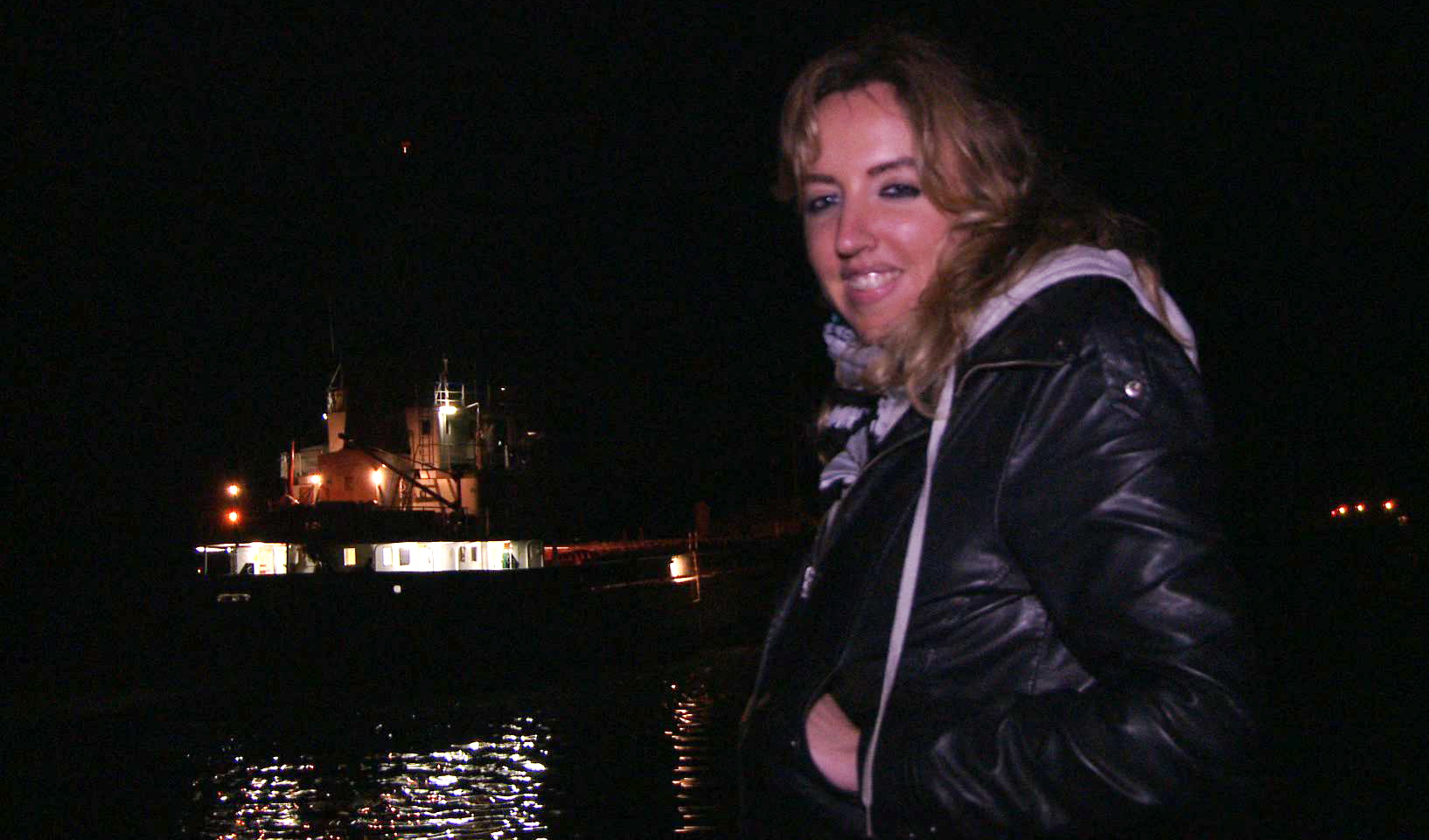
- Caoimhe Butterly with the MV Rachel Corrie in 2010
- Born: Dublin, Ireland
- Occupations: Human rights activist; psychotherapist

Caoimhe Butterly is an Irish human rights campaigner, psychotherapist, educator and filmmaker who has spent over twenty years working in humanitarian and social justice contexts in Haiti, Guatemala, Mexico, Palestine, Iraq, Lebanon and with refugee communities in Europe.

She is a peace activist who has worked with people with AIDS in Zimbabwe, the homeless in New York, and with Zapatistas in Mexico as well as more recently in the Middle East and Haiti. In 2002, during an Israeli Defence Forces attack in Jenin, she was shot by an Israeli soldier. She spent 16 days inside the compound where Yasser Arafat was besieged in Ramallah. She was named by Time magazine as one of their Europeans of the Year in 2003 and in 2016 won the Irish Council for Civil Liberties Human Rights Film award for her coverage of the refugee crisis. Butterly is a pacifist and a member of the International Solidarity Movement (ISM), an organisation that seeks non-violent alternatives to armed intifada by mobilising international civil society.

== Early life ==
Caoimhe Butterly was born in Dublin to a family therapist. Her father's work as a United Nations economist moved the family from Ireland to Zimbabwe when she was a young child. She grew up in Canada, Mauritius, and Zimbabwe due to her father's work with the United Nations. She spent time working in the New York Catholic Worker Movement, then moved to Latin America where she spent three years living with indigenous communities in Guatemala and in Chiapas, Mexico. She also lived in the Jenin refugee camp in the West Bank for a year. She has visited Iraq on numerous occasions, she visited Lebanon, where she protested British prime minister Tony Blair's visit to the country after he allowed US bomb shipments to be sent to Israel via Britain during the 2006 Lebanon War.

Butterly was brought up in a culture of liberation theology, which, she says, "deeply inspired" her to engage in human rights work. She spent time working as a volunteer in AIDS hospices in Zimbabwe as a teenager. At a very young age, she says, she developed a deep sense of duty. "I've always felt the need to almost a painful degree of needing to stand up against injustices in whatever contexts they lie." She left high school at 18, wanting to travel, and headed to New York, where she spent a year working in the city's Catholic Worker house, founded by Dorothy Day and Peter Maurin in 1933.

== Humanitarian work and activism ==
After New York, in 1998, she moved to Latin America where she spent three years living with indigenous and Zapatista communities in Guatemala and Chiapas. She later worked with refugees and internally displaced communities in the West Bank, Gaza, Iraq and Lebanon, which included work as a volunteer EMT with ambulance services.

In 2001 she spent 10 days fasting in front of the offices of the Irish Department of Foreign Affairs, in protest at the Irish government's decision to allow US warplanes to refuel at Shannon Airport on their way to Afghanistan. She was arrested while trying to block the runway.

=== Siege of the Arafat compound ===
In April 2002, she spent 16 days with other volunteers inside the besieged Muqaata compound in Ramallah, in solidarity with the Palestinians and to protest the Israeli military presence in the area. She was later wounded during a military incursion into Jenin refugee camp.

=== Jenin incident ===
On 22 November 2002, during an Israeli military operation in Jenin amid the Second Intifada, Butterly, then 24 years old, was shot by an Israeli soldier and suffered a thigh injury. She had been trying to lead a group of Palestinian children to safety.

In an interview in The Guardian, journalist Katie Barlow reported being inspired to meet Butterly by the footage of her blocking Israel Defense Forces tanks as they fired over her head, and stories of her standing in the line of fire between soldiers and Palestinian children, as the IDF threatened to "make her a hero". In the report, Barlow described how Butterly ran straight, despite the continuing fire, toward a disabled Palestinian boy who was shot by an Israeli sniper. Later a Red Crescent ambulance arrived at the scene and amid continuing gunfire, the paramedics got the boy into the vehicle, the snipers managed to shoot through the ambulance window, shattering glass all over the boy, and nearly killing the local cameraman who was filming a report. The boy would survive, but was paralysed from the waist down.

After being shot, Butterly, who had by then spent more than a year standing in the path of Israeli tanks and troops, refused to leave: "I'm going nowhere. I am staying until this occupation ends. I have the right to be here, a responsibility to be here. So does anyone who knows what is going on here."

=== Iraq War ===
Before the 2003 invasion of Iraq, Butterly campaigned against the Irish government's decision to allow the United States military to use Shannon Airport. She was initially a signatory to the Pitstop Ploughshares action that disabled a US warplane at Shannon in February 2003, but decided ultimately not to participate out of a desire to travel to Iraq in solidarity with civilians there. At a 2003 Belfast summit between US President George W. Bush and British Prime Minister Tony Blair, Butterly was arrested and dragged away by her hair for smearing red jam on the riot shields of two policemen. "There is no such thing as a benign occupation" she says. "It's time to focus again on what is happening in Baghdad."

=== Stay in Beirut ===
After the 2006 war in Lebanon, British Prime Minister Tony Blair went on a political trip to the Middle East for meetings with leaders of the region. A feeling of anger against Blair was mounting in Lebanon, in relation to his stance during the war, his refusal to call for an immediate ceasefire and his aligning of his policies with those of American President George W. Bush in support of the Israeli military operation. Butterly interrupted Blair's press conference with the Lebanese Prime Minister Fouad Siniora, accusing Blair of complicity in the recent Israeli bombardment of Lebanon. "This visit is an insult", "Shame on you Tony Blair" Butterly shouted as Siniora and Blair spoke at Siniora's office complex. She held a banner saying "Boycott Israeli apartheid" in front of live TV cameras, until security guards holding her by arms and legs carried her out. Blair and Siniora stood quietly as she shouted.

=== Iain Hook incident ===
In 2005, she gave written eyewitness testimony in the inquest into the killing of UNRWA relief works project manager Iain Hook by an Israeli military sniper. Butterly was also shot in the foot during this incident.

=== Gaza flotilla ===
Butterly was aboard a flotilla bringing relief supplies to Gaza during the Gaza flotilla raid on 31 May 2010.

In July 2025, she joined the first leg of the Handala, another ship carrying activists and humanitarian supplies with the goal of breaking the tightened Israeli blockade amid the Gaza war.

In August 2025, Butterly took part in the Global Sumud Flotilla, a civilian-led attempt to break the Israeli blockade of the Gaza Strip.

=== Other ventures ===
In the aftermath of the 2010 earthquake in Haiti, she worked with mobile phone healthcare clinics and psycho-social projects there. She later returned to third level education in her early 30s, completing Masters in Development Studies and in Systemic Pschotherapy.

== Current work ==
Following 15 years working with humanitarian and rights projects in the Middle East, Butterly returned to Ireland. She is based in Dublin, though continues to work with trauma-informed psycho-social support programmes and Search and Rescue response with refugees in Greece, Calais, Italy, Lebanon and the Central Mediterranean. She also lectures and works in critical Development Education and writes for various refugee-related publications.

== See also ==
- List of peace activists
