= Linda McCarriston =

American poet (1943–2026)

Linda J. McCarriston (July 30, 1943 – July 5, 2026) was an Irish-American poet and academic who was a professor in the Department of Creative Writing and Literature at the University of Alaska Anchorage, teaching creative writing and literary arts from 1994.

== Background ==
McCarriston had completed her Master of Fine Arts in Creative Writing from Goddard College in Vermont and a BFA at Emmanuel College in Boston. She has taught at Vermont College, Goddard College and George Washington University and has been a Poetry Fellow at the Bunting Institute of Radcliffe College.

McCarriston died on July 5, 2026, at the age of 82.

== Poetry ==
American journalist, public commentator, and former White House Press Secretary Bill Moyers says she writes "about women, children, animals — healing" that "deal with the domestic violence that marred her childhood in working-class Lynn, Massachusetts and her subsequent feelings as a wife and mother." According to National Book Award winner Lisel Mueller: "Linda McCarriston accomplishes a near miracle, transforming memories of trauma into poems that are luminous and often sacramental, arriving at a hard-won peace."

While she was writing for the Maine Sunday Telegram, in Spring 1979 issue of literary journal Ploughshares, printed her 5 poems named, "Moon in Aquarius", "Eve", "Desire", "The Cleaving" and "Intent" as her first poetry publication.

Her poems have appeared in The Atlantic Monthly, New England Monthly, Harvard Review and "in a broad range of anthologies", she is interviewed by Terry Gross on Fresh Air (a local radio) and featured in Bill Moyers' "The Language of Life: A Festival of Poets" at Public Broadcasting Service (PBS) and book The Language of Life: A Festival of Poets, 1995. She interviewed for All Things Considered, National Public Radio (NPR), aired July 14, 2001, included in Linda Hogan's "Intimate Nature" and Robert McDowell's "Cowboy Poetry Matters" and in The New York Times Book Review.

Her poem "Le Coursier de Jeanne d'Arc" was scored for soprano Judith Coen by Bruno Rigacci and had its premiere at the Spoleto Arts Symposia in July 2000.
Two of her poems were read by Garrison Keillor in "The Writer's Almanac", NPR, in the week of April 18, 2000.
Invited to contribute 60-page autobiography to Contemporary Authors Autobiography Series, Gale Research, 1996.

McCarriston was a speaker with the poet Richard Hoffman, Grace Paley, Marybeth Holleman and Elizabeth Wales, at the panel titled "Writing with Heart AND Intellect" during Annual AWP Conference, Vancouver, British Columbia on March 31, 2005.

== Honors and awards ==
- 1984, AWP Award Series Selection.
- 1991, Eva-Mary, book of 35 poems, won the Terrence Des Pres Prize.
- 1991, National Book Award for Poetry finalist, Eva-Mary.
- 1996, Chancellor's Award for Excellence in Creative Activity, UAA.
- 2004, Alaska Press Women's Communicator of Achievement award, as APW Treasurer, for her "career accomplishments, as well as her participation in APW." Jan Ingram, from the award committee stated, "Linda is a nationally acclaimed poet who fought her way through difficult personal issues and the social pressures of her generation to find her voice. For her students and for the rest of us, she models courage and honesty."

== Works ==
- Talking Soft Dutch. Texas Tech Press. 1984. ISBN 978-0-89672-115-9.
- Eva-Mary. Northwestern University Press. 1991. ISBN 978-0-8101-5008-9.
- As though you were rare, you confessed. Midnight Paper Sales. 1997.
- Little river: new & selected poems. Salmon Pub. 2000. ISBN 978-1-897648-17-9.
