= International Solidarity Movement =

Internationalist non-violent protest organization that campaigns for Palestinian rights

- Abbreviation: ISM
- Formation: August 2001; 25 years ago
- Founder: Ghassan Andoni, Neta Golan, Huwaida Arraf, George Rishmawi
- Volunteers: >3,500 (2007)
- Website: palsolidarity.org

The International Solidarity Movement (ISM; Arabic: حركة التضامن العالمية, romanized: Ḥarakat al-Taḍāmun al-ʻĀlamīyah) is a Palestinian-led organization focused on assisting the Palestinian cause in the Israeli–Palestinian conflict. ISM is dedicated to the use of nonviolent protests and methods only. The organization calls on civilians from around the world to participate in acts of nonviolent protests against the Israeli military in the West Bank and the Gaza Strip. The ISM participates in the Free Gaza Movement.

== History ==
The ISM was founded in 2001 by Ghassan Andoni, a Palestinian activist; Neta Golan, a third generation Israeli activist; Huwaida Arraf, a Palestinian-American; and George N. Rishmawi, a Palestinian activist. Jewish-American activist Adam Shapiro joined the group shortly after its founding, and is also often considered one of its founders.

The group has been spied on by the British state with a Special Demonstration Squad member 'Rob Harrison' infiltrating the movement from 2004 till 2007.

== Volunteer costs ==
According to the ISM's website, international volunteers who join the ISM are responsible for paying their own way and covering all their expenses in Palestine.

== Philosophy ==
The organization calls on civilians from around the world to participate in acts of non-violent protests against the Israeli military in the West Bank and the Gaza Strip. It has been criticised for working alongside other groups to pressure Palestinian artists to boycott the One Voice Peace Summit and for helping to undermine the Summit by creating a competing event. ISM and affiliated groups critical of the Summit say that One Voice fails to fully support Palestinian rights guaranteed under international law.

=== ISM's position on violence ===
The ISM's website describes the organization as a "Palestinian-led movement committed to resisting the Israeli occupation of Palestinian land using nonviolent, direct-action methods and principles". It emphasizes international volunteers are not there to "teach nonviolent resistance" but to support resistance through nonviolent direct action, emergency mobilization and documentation.

An article in the British newspaper The Daily Telegraph called ISM "the 'peace' group that embraces violence" because its mission statement recognises "armed struggle" as the "right" of Palestinians. The statement in question is taken from the ISM Mission Statement:

As enshrined in international law and UN resolutions, we recognize the Palestinian right to resist Israeli violence and occupation via legitimate armed struggle. However, we believe that nonviolence can be a powerful weapon in fighting oppression and we are committed to the principles of nonviolent resistance.

ISM further explains on its website:

The ISM does not support or condone any acts of terrorism – which is not legitimate armed struggle. The ISM does not associate, support, or have anything to do with armed or violent resistance to the occupation. The ISM does not assist or engage in any kind of armed resistance, no matter what form it may take.

This right to resist occupation applies not only to the Palestinian people, but to all peoples who are faced with a military occupation. The ISM regards all people as equals with equal rights under international law. We believe that nonviolent action is a powerful weapon in fighting oppression and are committed to the principles of nonviolent resistance.

During a CNN interview, Paula Zahn with Adam Shapiro and Huwaida Arraf asked about an article they had co-authored which stated: "Palestinian resistance must take on a variety of characteristics, both violent and nonviolent. But most importantly, it must develop a strategy involving both aspects. Nonviolent resistance is no less noble than carrying out a suicide operation." She noted that "some people could lead to the conclusion that you were promoting suicide bombing." Shapiro and Arraf replied:

The article that we wrote was actually in response to another article written by a Palestinian, who said the Palestinians could not be nonviolent. And so we were addressing within the context of the debate over whether the Palestinians could use violence or could not use nonviolence or could use nonviolence. So it was, first of all, within that context...

There already is violence. We’re not advocating it. It's already there. It's on the ground. We’re working with people and with Palestinians who want to promote nonviolence, and that was the context of the whole article.

=== Activism tactics ===
Past ISM campaigns have used the following tactics:

- Acting to deter military operations. Some ISM volunteers object to the use of the term human shield to describe their work because, they argue, in a Palestinian context the expression more usually refers to forced use of captive Palestinians by the Israel Defense Forces (IDF) when searching Palestinian neighborhoods. They argue that the IDF is far more likely to shoot the darker skinned Palestinian civilians than white western looking activists, given the difference in international response. This tactic is colloquially referred to as the "white-face defense".
- Accompanying Palestinians to minimize harassment perpetuated by Israeli settlers or soldiers, for example ensuring that queues at Israeli checkpoints are processed efficiently and providing witnesses and intermediaries during annual olive harvests, which are often disrupted by settlers and police.
- Removing roadblocks. These are large unmanned mounds of earth and concrete on roads throughout the West Bank, and sometimes placed at the entrances of Palestinian villages by the IDF, thereby isolating those villages' inhabitants by preventing traffic in or out.
- Attempting to block military vehicles such as tanks and bulldozers.
- Violating Israeli curfew orders enforced on Palestinian areas in order to monitor Israeli military actions, deliver food and medicine to Palestinian homes, or escort medical personnel to help facilitate their work.
- Interfering with the construction of the West Bank barrier and placing political graffiti on the wall.
- Entering areas designated as "closed military zones" by the Israeli military. This is not really a 'strategy' as such, but is a prerequisite for ISM being able to conduct many of the above activities as areas in which the ISM is active are often summarily designated as "closed military zones" by the IDF.
- Attempting to break the Israeli blockade of the Gaza Strip by supporting and participating in initiatives to send vessels through the naval blockade to Gaza.

== Noteworthy ISM events ==
- The ISM received extensive media coverage of its presence in Yasser Arafat's compound in Ramallah and at the Church of the Nativity in Bethlehem.
- On August 8, 2006, ISM activist Adam Shapiro announced that a group of ISM activists was traveling to southern Lebanon to attempt to deliver aid and show solidarity with suffering residents.
- ISM was nominated for the 2004 Nobel Peace Prize by Svend Robinson, a former New Democratic Party Member of the Parliament of Canada.
- Cofounder Ghassan Andoni was nominated for the 2006 Nobel Peace Prize along with Jeff Halper of the Israeli Committee Against House Demolitions by the American Friends Service Committee.

== ISM member casualties in Palestine and Israel ==
=== ISM member casualties timeline ===
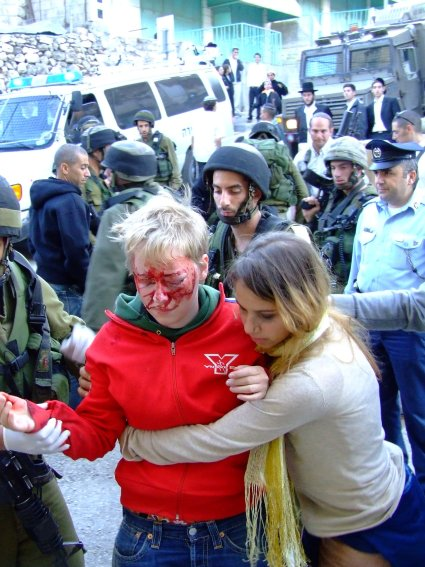
19-year-old Swedish ISM volunteer wounded by Israeli settlers in Hebron in November 2006.

- On 2 April 2002, Australian ISM volunteer Kate Edwards sustained severe internal injuries from rounds fired by Israeli forces during a protest in Beit Jala. The incident was captured on film and appears in the documentary by Palestinian film-maker Leila Sansour, Jeremy Hardy vs the Israeli Army.
- On November 22, 2002 Caoimhe Butterly, an Irish ISM volunteer was shot and injured by IDF in Jenin minutes before UNRWA relief works project manager, Briton Iain Hook was killed nearby.
- On 16 March 2003, United States ISM volunteer Rachel Corrie was killed while trying to block an IDF armoured bulldozer. See below.
- On 5 April 2003, US ISM volunteer Brian Avery was shot in the face and permanently disfigured by machine gun fire from an IDF armoured personnel carrier while he was escorting Palestinian medical personnel in the street.
- On 11 April 2003, British ISM volunteer Thomas Hurndall was left clinically brain dead after he was shot in the head by an IDF soldier. Initially the soldier claimed the shooting occurred during an armed firefight between Israeli soldiers and Palestinian militants but the prosecuted soldier later admitted firing at him "as a deterrent". Hurndall died on 13 January 2004. In early 2009, the family is reported to have accepted a payout of £1.5m and said that "the settlement was the nearest they could get to an admission of guilt from Israel".
- On September 6, 2007, ISM activist Akram Ibrahim Abu Sba was killed by members of Islamic Jihad in northern Jenin.
- On March 13, 2009, American demonstrator Tristan Anderson was critically wounded near Nil'in when shot with a tear gas canister during a clash between protesters and IDF troops over the West Bank security barrier.
- On April 24, 2010, Bianca Zammit, a 28-year-old activist from Malta, was shot in the thigh with live ammunition by IDF soldiers during a demonstration in the so-called "buffer zone" inside Gaza Strip. Two Palestinian demonstrators were also shot during the same demonstration in Al Maghazi Refugee Camp.
- On May 31, 2010, Emily Henochowicz, a 21-year-old art student from Maryland, lost her left eye when she was struck by a tear gas canister while protesting near Qalandiya checkpoint. Another ISM volunteer at the scene claimed that the Israeli soldiers deliberately aimed at Henochowicz.
- On 14 April 2011, Italian activist Vittorio Arrigoni was abducted, tortured and killed in Gaza by the Jahafil Al-Tawhid Wal-Jihad fi Filastin Palestinian Salafist group. The murder was condemned by various Palestinian factions.

==== Killings ====
===== Rachel Corrie =====
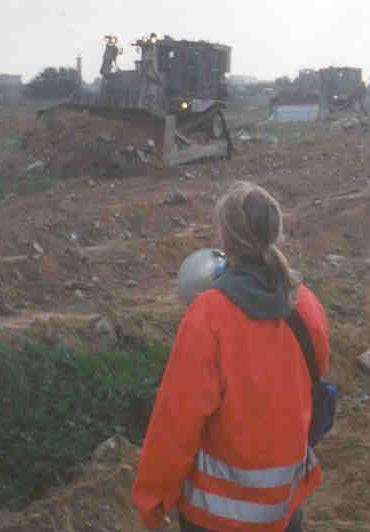
Rachel Corrie stands before Israeli IDF Caterpillar D9 bulldozers

ISM volunteer Rachel Corrie was killed as she attempted to block an Israel Defense Forces (IDF) bulldozer conducting military operations in Rafah in the Gaza Strip on March 16, 2003. An internal IDF investigation concluded that Corrie's death was an accident but ISM eyewitnesses dispute this account, contending that the bulldozer driver deliberately struck Corrie as she was protesting in plain view. The IDF says that tapes of the event show Corrie below the driver's eye level, and also say that the noise level was too loud for Ms. Corrie to be heard. The activities of the bulldozer she was blocking are also subject to disagreement — ISM claim it was preparing to demolish the home of a Palestinian pharmacist. Other accounts backed by the film footage claim that the bulldozer was not near the house but was removing shrubbery covering a structure that could be used as an arms smuggling tunnel or to cover terrorists shooting at the IDF.

George Rishmawi of the ISM told the San Francisco Chronicle that: "When Palestinians get shot by Israeli soldiers, no one is interested anymore. But if some of these foreign volunteers get shot or even killed, then the international media will sit up and take notice."

Corrie's parents brought lawsuits in the United States and in Israel, but in both cases, they lost the suit. In Israel, in August 2012, the court said that Corrie could have avoided danger. The court ruled that Israel was not at fault for Corrie's death, and there was neither intent nor negligence involved in her death. The judge also said that Israel's investigation was appropriate and did not contain mistakes. The judge also criticized the U.S. for failing to send a diplomatic representative to observe Corrie's autopsy.

===== Tom Hurndall =====
On April 11, 2003 Israel Defense Forces (IDF) soldier Sergeant Taysir Hayb shot International Solidarity Movement (ISM) volunteer Tom Hurndall in the head. Hurndall, who had been aiding Palestinians in Gaza, died of his wound in January 2004. Hurndall was unarmed, dressed in the bright orange jacket of the ISM, and steering two Palestinian children away from an Israeli tank-mounted machine gun shooting in their direction.

Hayb claimed he had shot at a man in military fatigues who was firing at the soldiers with a pistol, in the no-go security zone. This was at odds with the ISM's account, confirmed by photographic evidence.

Subsequently, Hayb admitted to fabricating his account of events. On 10 May 2004, Hayb's trial commenced on one charge of manslaughter in the death of Tom Hurndall, two counts of obstruction of justice, one count each of submitting false testimony, obtaining false testimony, and unbecoming behavior. Hurndall's family pressed for a murder charge through the Israeli courts. In August 2005, Taysir Hayb was convicted of manslaughter and sentenced to a total of eight years imprisonment, seven years for the manslaughter of Hurndall and one year for obstruction of justice.

===== Aysenur Eygi =====
On 6 September 2024, Aysenur Ezgi Eygi, a 26-year-old American-Turkish woman was attending a weekly protest held near the Israeli settlement of Evyatar, and allegedly was shot and killed by IDF snipers. The protest was against the continued expansion of Israeli settlements and had attracted violence prior to the incident. Witnesses reported that IDF forces had confronted the activists and shot at them with tear gas and live ammunition to force them to disperse. About thirty minutes after the confrontation, protestors reported that two IDF snipers on a roof about 200 yards away opened fire, killing Eygi and wounding a Palestinian teenager in the leg.

==== Injuries ====
===== Kate Edwards =====
Australian ISM volunteer Kate Edwards sustained internal injuries from a bullet in Beit Jala. She and other volunteers marched on Israeli lines. After the event, Kate Edwards was quoted as stating "We were walking up the hill from Bethlehem when a tank came down the hill towards us. I could see a man in the tank and he was shouting at us to go back. We carried on going."

===== Caoimhe Butterly =====
Irish ISM volunteer and human rights activist Caoimhe Butterly was shot in the thigh by an Israeli soldier during the Battle of Jenin.

===== Brian Avery =====
On April 5, 2003, Israeli Defense Force soldiers on a military convoy shot Brian Avery (born 1979) in the face, seriously disfiguring him, while he was volunteering for the ISM in the West Bank city of Jenin. He was wearing red reflector vests with the word "doctor" in English and Arabic. The IDF refused to order an investigation, saying there was no proof its soldiers had shot at anyone that day. Avery sued and in November 2008 accepted a $150,000 settlement from the Israeli government in exchange for dropping the lawsuit.

===== Tristan Anderson =====
On March 13, 2009, American ISM volunteer Tristan Anderson was critically injured after being hit in the head by a tear gas canister fired by Israeli troops attempting to disperse a demonstration. Anderson was taken to a hospital in Israel, where he underwent brain surgery, and had to have a portion of his frontal lobe and fragments of shattered bone removed. ISM volunteer and Tristan's girlfriend Gabrielle Silverman (Israeli-American), who witnessed to his injury:

"We were at a demonstration against the wall, against the Israeli apartheid wall in the West Bank village of Ni'lin, which is about twenty-six kilometers west of Ramallah. I was very close to him when he was shot. I was only a few feet away. The demonstration had been going for several hours. It was wrapping up; it was almost over. Most people had already gone home. We were standing on some grass nearby a village mosque, and Tristan was taking pictures [when] he was shot in the head with the extended range tear gas canister."

===== Bianca Zammit =====
On April 24, 2010, Bianca Zammit, a 28 year old activist from Malta, was shot in the thigh with live ammunition by IDF soldiers during a demonstration in the so-called "buffer zone" inside Gaza Strip. Two Palestinian demonstrators were also shot during the same demonstration in Al Maghazi Refugee Camp.

===== April 2012 =====
On April 14, a group of at least 200 pro-Palestinian activists were travelling on bicycles, and several buses in a silent protest. They were stopped by Israeli soldiers before entering onto Highway 90, and asked not to continue for their own safety. The legality of the protesters action is unclear as some news agencies state the cyclists got permission to protest but others state no permit was given. During the ensuing hour, the activists refused and blocked an entrance to a highway, a "scuffle" broke out. In an interview given by one of the members he stated "בשלב מסויים החלטנו לאתגר את החיילים ולנסות להמשיך בנסיעה" ("... at some point we decided to test the soldiers and continue to move") and after a few moments they had been assaulted. In an interview for JPost "After about half-an-hour, he said, the cyclists decided to push past the IDF, and that is when the violence began." Four activists sustained face and back injuries and had to be evacuated to a hospital in Jericho, West Bank. The next day, ISM posted a video showing an IDF officer hitting a Danish protester in the face with his assault rifle. The IDF officer said that he was attacked by one of the activists in the incident with a stick, breaking two fingers. The IDF said it was a "grave incident" and was suspending the officer and investigating the incident. Israeli Prime Minister Benjamin Netanyahu, President Shimon Peres, and IDF Chief of General Staff Lt.-Gen. Benny Gantz all condemned the incident. NGO Monitor said that ISM "has a long record of encouraging activists to take 'direct action' that often places them in danger and in direct confrontations with the IDF."

===== Fred Ekblad =====
On July 25, 2014, Swedish activist Fred Ekblad had a moderate injury in his head from an Israeli tank shelling Beit Hanoun hospital in the Gaza Strip.

=== ISM casualties by Palestinian militants ===
==== Deaths ====
===== Akram Ibrahim Abu Sba' =====
On September 6, 2007, ISM Jenin regional committee member and "co-founder of one of ISM's first permanent presences" Akram Ibrahim Abu Sba’ was killed on duty by Islamic Jihad militants, while trying to "smooth tensions between Palestinian security forces and Islamic Jihad members", in the Palestinian city of Jenin. Akram was buried in the Jenin refugee camp graveyard.

===== Vittorio Arrigoni =====
On April 14, 2011, Italian ISM activist Vittorio Arrigoni was abducted, tortured and executed by hanging by a Salafist group in the Gaza Strip.

== Criticism and controversies ==
=== Position of Israeli Foreign Ministry ===
The Israeli Foreign Ministry reported that two terrorists involved in the Mike's Place suicide bombing forged "links with foreign left wing activists and members of the International Solidarity Movement (ISM)." The MFA also says that "ISM members take an active part in illegal and violent actions against IDF soldiers. At times, their activity in Judea, Samaria and the Gaza Strip is under the auspices of Palestinian terrorist organizations, and that sometimes, "ISM members, who seek entry into Israel, often do so under false pretenses, via cover stories – entry for matrimonial, tourist, religious and other purposes – which they coordinate prior to arriving in Israel." However, ISM reports that visitors at the border who identify as ISM volunteers, almost always will be denied entry by the Israeli border control.

=== Shadi Sukiya case ===
On March 27, 2003, Palestinian Shadi Sukiya was arrested in by the Israel Defense Forces in ISM Jenin. The Israeli government claimed that Sukiya was a senior Islamic Jihad member, and that he was aided by two ISM activists.

Both parties stated that Sukiya arrived at the ISM's office as he was being pursued through the streets of Jenin by IDF soldiers during an Israeli-imposed curfew. According to the ISM's account, he had been going door to door looking for a place to go, arrived at the building (which is also used by the Red Cross and Medecins Sans Frontieres) cold and wet, and was offered a chance to dry and warm up by an ISM volunteer.

The IDF originally suggested that two Kalashnikov assault rifles and a handgun were found on the premises, but subsequently backtracked on the allegation.

In May 2003, Adam Shapiro from ISM stated that Sukiya was not named a "senior Islamic Jihad terrorist" by any official Israeli military or government source, and was being held in administrative detention in Israel without any charge.

=== Ties with Palestinian militants ===
The Israeli government asserted ISM activist Susan Barclay had "ties with Palestinian terrorist groups". She stated she worked with representatives of Hamas and Islamic Jihad in organising a nonviolent protest.

According to Israeli sources, ISM activists maintain ties with "Palestinian terrorists", aiding them, disrupting IDF activities and in some instance even attacked IDF soldiers.

"Israel says that the connection between ISM activists to Palestinian terrorists is not merely sleeping in terrorists' houses. According to Israel Security Service (Shin-Bet), some of the activists maintain connections with terrorists, and act to disrupt IDF operations in the territories. In one case ISM activists exposed an ambush set by the IDF after lighting on it with flashlights. In July, two ISM activists attacked soldiers in Beit-Pourik checkpoint. IDF officer tells that in several cases ISM activists opened routes to Palestinians by going first to check if there is a military checkpoint in the way."

Richard David Hupper, an ISM activist, was convicted in a US court of illegally funding Hamas while working with the ISM. Hupper donated money which he intended to be used to aid the families of Palestinians who had been detained or killed.

=== Israeli court ruling ===
In 2012, Israeli judge Oded Gershon ruled about the ISM that "In fact, the organization abuses human rights and morals discourse to blur the severity of its actions which manifested de facto as violence." He also ruled that ISM activists provided financial, logistic and moral aid to terrorists.

== See also ==
- Osama Qashoo
