= Rachel Corrie =

American nonviolence activist and diarist (1979–2003)

- Born: Rachel Aliene Corrie; April 10, 1979; Olympia, Washington, U.S.
- Died: March 16, 2003 (aged 23); Rafah, Gaza Strip, Palestine
- Cause of death: Crushed by an Israeli armored bulldozer
- Education: Capital High School; Evergreen State College
- Occupations: Activist; diarist
- Years active: 1997–2003
- Movement: International Solidarity Movement

Rachel Aliene Corrie (April 10, 1979 – March 16, 2003) was an American nonviolence activist and diarist. She was a member of the pro-Palestinian International Solidarity Movement (ISM), and was active throughout the Israeli-occupied Palestinian territories. In 2003, she was in Rafah, a city in the Gaza Strip under Israeli occupation, where the demolishment of Palestinian houses by Israeli forces was taking place at the height of the Second Intifada. While protesting the demolitions as they were being carried out, she was killed by an Israeli driving an armored bulldozer that crushed her.

Corrie was born in Olympia, Washington, in 1979. After graduating from Capital High School, she went on to attend Evergreen State College. She took a year off from her studies to work as a volunteer in the Washington State Conservation Corps, where she spent three years making weekly visits to mental patients. While at Evergreen State College, she became a "committed peace activist", arranging peace events through a local group called "Olympians for Peace and Solidarity". She later joined the International Solidarity Movement (ISM) organization in order to protest the policies of the Israeli army in the West Bank and Gaza Strip. Corrie went to Gaza as part of her college's senior-year independent-study proposal to connect Olympia and Rafah with each other as sister cities. While in Rafah on March 16, 2003, she joined other ISM activists in efforts to nonviolently prevent Israel's demolition of Palestinian property, where she was killed by an Israeli bulldozer that crushed her. Corrie's death sparked controversy and led to international media coverage.

Physicians present and fellow ISM activists stated that Corrie had been wearing a high-visibility vest and was deliberately driven over, while the Israeli army said that it was an accident because the bulldozer operator did not see her. Following the incident, an Israeli military investigation concluded that Corrie's death was the result of an accident and that the bulldozer operator had limited visibility. The ruling attracted criticism from organizations such as Amnesty International, Human Rights Watch (HRW), B'Tselem, and Yesh Din. HRW stated that the ruling represented a pattern of impunity for Israeli forces. In 2012, U.S. Ambassador to Israel Dan Shapiro stated that the Israeli investigation was unsatisfactory, lacking thoroughness, credibility and transparency, and that therefore the U.S. government was unsatisfied with the investigation's closure.

== Early life ==
Corrie was born on April 10, 1979, and raised in Olympia, Washington. She was the youngest of three children of Craig Corrie, an insurance executive, and Cindy Corrie. Cindy describes their family as "average Americans—politically liberal, economically conservative, middle class". After graduating from Capital High School, Corrie went on to attend the Evergreen State College, also in Olympia, where she took a number of arts courses. She took a year off from her studies to work as a volunteer in the Washington State Conservation Corps. According to the International Solidarity Movement (ISM), she spent three years making weekly visits to mental patients.

While at Evergreen State College she became a "committed peace activist", arranging peace events through a local pro-ISM group called "Olympians for Peace and Solidarity". She later joined the ISM organization in order to protest the policies of the Israeli army in the West Bank and Gaza Strip. In her senior year, she "proposed an independent-study program in which she would travel to Gaza, join the ISM team, and initiate a 'sister city' project between Olympia and Rafah". Before leaving, she also organized a pen-pal program between children in Olympia and Rafah.

== Activities in Gaza ==
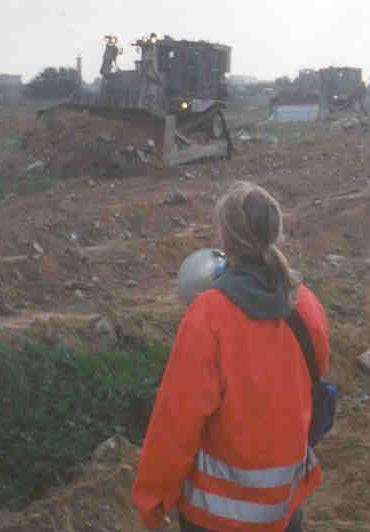
Rachel Corrie stands before Israeli military's Caterpillar D9 bulldozers

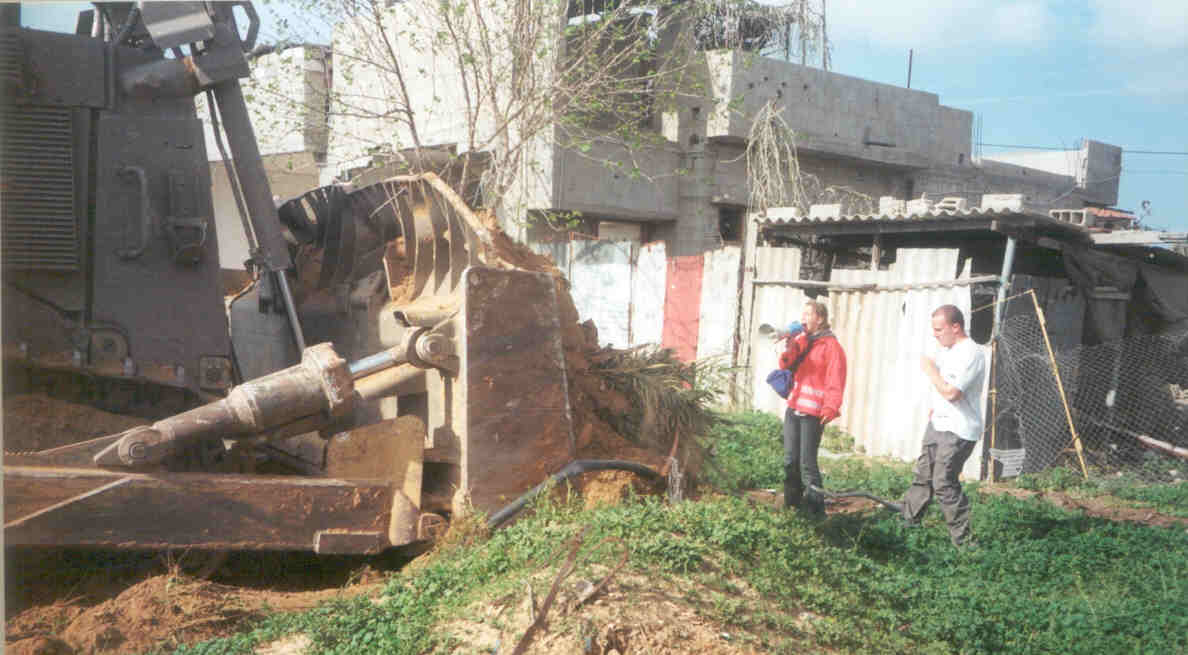
Rachel Corrie opposing the demolition of Palestinian homes by Israeli army

While in Rafah, Corrie stood in front of armored bulldozers, in an attempt to impede house demolitions which were being carried out. These military operations were criticized as "collective punishment" by some human rights groups. Israel authorities said that demolitions were necessary because "Palestinian gunmen used the structures as cover to shoot at their troops patrolling in the area, or to conceal arms-smuggling tunnels under the Gaza-Egypt border." Corrie was a member of a group of about eight activists from outside of the Palestinian territories who tried to prevent the Israeli army's activities by acting as human shields.

On Corrie's first night there, she and two other ISM members set up camp inside Block J, which the ISM described as "a densely populated neighborhood along the Pink Line and frequent target of gunfire from an Israeli watchtower". By situating themselves visibly between the Palestinians and the Israeli snipers manning the watchtowers they hoped to discourage shooting by displaying banners stating that they were "internationals". When Israeli soldiers fired warning shots, Corrie and her colleagues dismantled their tent and left the area.

Qishta, a Palestinian who worked as an interpreter, noted: "Late January and February was a very crazy time. There were house demolitions taking place all over the border strip and the activists had no time to do anything else." Qishta also stated of the ISM activists: "They were not only brave; they were crazy." The safety of the protestors was frequently jeopardized by these confrontations— a British participant was wounded by shrapnel while retrieving the body of a Palestinian man killed by a sniper, and an Irish ISM activist had a close encounter with an armored bulldozer.

Palestinian militants expressed concern that the "internationals" staying in tents between the Israeli watchtowers and the residential neighborhoods would get caught in crossfire, while other residents were concerned that the activists might be spies. To overcome this suspicion Corrie learned a few words of Arabic and participated in a mock trial denouncing the "crimes of the Bush Administration". While the ISM members were eventually provided with food and housing, a letter was circulated in Rafah that cast suspicion on them. "Who are they? Why are they here? Who asked them to come here?" On the morning of Corrie's death they planned to counteract the letter's effects. According to one of them, "We all had a feeling that our role was too passive. We talked about how to engage the Israeli military."

=== Water-well protecting efforts ===
According to a January 2003 article by Gordon Murray, a fellow ISM activist, in the last month of her life Corrie "spent a lot of time at the Canada Well helping protect Rafah municipal workers" who were trying to repair damage to the well done by Israeli bulldozers. Canada Well was built in 1999 with CIDA funding. It, along with El Iskan Well, had supplied more than 50% of Rafah's water before the damage. The city had been under "strict rationing (only a few hours of running water on alternate days)" since. Murray writes that ISM activists were maintaining a presence there since "Israeli snipers and tanks routinely shot at civilian workers trying to repair the wells." In one of her reports, Corrie wrote that despite her group's having received permission from the Israeli District Command Office and the fact that they were carrying "banners and megaphones the activists and workers were fired upon several times over a period of about one hour. One of the bullets came within two metres of three internationals and a municipal water worker close enough to spray bits of debris in their faces as it landed at their feet."

=== Burning an American flag while protesting the Iraq War ===
While in Gaza, Corrie took part in a demonstration as part of the February 15, 2003 anti-war protest against the invasion of Iraq. She was photographed burning a makeshift U.S. flag. After her death, the ISM released a statement quoting Corrie's parents on the widely circulated picture of the incident:

In the words of Rachel's parents: "The act, while we may disagree with it, must be put into context. Rachel was partaking in a demonstration in Gaza opposing the War on Iraq. She was working with children who drew two pictures, one of the American flag, and one of the Israeli flag, for burning. Rachel said that she could not bring herself to burn the picture of the Israeli flag with the Star of David on it, but under such circumstances, in protest over a drive towards war and her government's foreign policy that was responsible for much of the devastation that she was witness to in Gaza, she felt it OK to burn the picture of her own flag. We have seen photographs of memorials held in Gaza after Rachel's death in which Palestinian children and adults honor our daughter by carrying a mock coffin draped with the American flag. We have been told that our flag has never been treated so respectfully in Gaza in recent years. We believe Rachel brought a different face of the United States to the Palestinian people, a face of compassion. It is this image of Rachel with the American flag that we hope will be remembered most.

=== Corrie's emails to her mother ===
I look forward to seeing more and more people willing to resist the direction the world is moving in, a direction where our personal experiences are irrelevant, that we are defective, that our communities are not important, that we are powerless, that our future is determined, and that the highest level of humanity is expressed through what we choose to buy at the mall

— Rachel Corrie, email

Corrie sent a series of emails to her mother while she was in Gaza, four of which were later published by The Guardian. In January 2008, Norton published a book titled Let Me Stand Alone by Corrie, which included the e-mails along with some of her other writings. Yale Professor David Bromwich said that Corrie left "letters of great interest". The play My Name Is Rachel Corrie, as well as The Skies are Weeping, a cantata, are based on Corrie's letters.

== Death and subsequent disputes ==
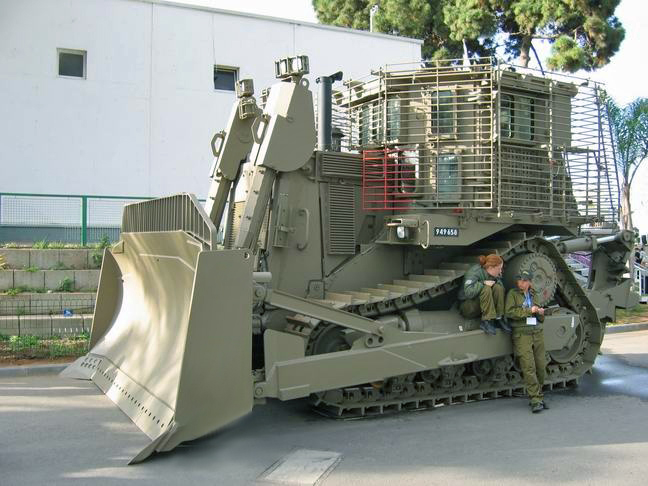
Caterpillar D9R armored bulldozer

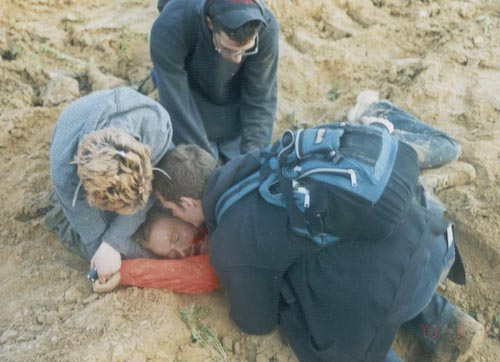
Corrie after she was mortally injured by the Israeli bulldozer

On March 16, 2003, the IDF was engaged in an operation involving the demolition of Palestinian houses in Rafah. Corrie was part of a group of three British and four American ISM activists attempting to disrupt the IDF operation. Corrie placed herself in the path of a Caterpillar D9R armored bulldozer in the area and was run over by the bulldozer and fatally injured. After she was injured she was taken by a Red Crescent ambulance to the Palestinian Najar hospital, arriving at the emergency room at 5:05 pm, still alive but in critical condition. At 5:20 pm she was declared dead.

The events surrounding Corrie's death are disputed. Fellow ISM activists said that the soldier operating the bulldozer deliberately ran Corrie over while she was acting as a human shield to prevent the demolition of the home of local pharmacist Samir Nasrallah. They said she was between the bulldozer and a wall near Nasrallah's home, in which ISM activists had spent the night several times. An IDF officer testified in court that her death was accidental because the bulldozer operator did not see Corrie due to the vehicle's obstructed view, and that on that day they were only clearing vegetation and rubble from houses that were previously demolished, and that no new houses were slated for demolition.

The major points of dispute are whether the bulldozer operator saw Corrie and whether her injuries were caused by being crushed under the blade or by the mound of debris the bulldozer was pushing. An IDF spokesman has acknowledged that Israeli army regulations normally require that the operators of the armored personnel carriers (APCs) that accompany bulldozers are responsible for directing the operators towards their targets because the Caterpillar D9 bulldozers have a restricted field of vision with several blind spots.

=== ISM accounts ===
An ISM activist using the name "Richard", saying he had witnessed Corrie's death, told Haaretz:

There's no way he didn't see her, since she was practically looking into the cabin. At one stage, he turned around toward the building. The bulldozer kept moving, and she slipped and fell off the plow. But the bulldozer kept moving, the shovel above her. I guess it was about 10 or 15 meters that it dragged her and for some reason didn't stop. We shouted like crazy to the operator through loudspeakers that he should stop, but he just kept going and didn't lift the shovel. Then it stopped and backed up. We ran to Rachel. She was still breathing.

Eyewitness and ISM member Tom Dale, commenting on the 2012 verdict said: "Whatever one thinks about the visibility from a D9 bulldozer, it is inconceivable that at some point the driver did not see her, given the distance from which he approached, while she stood, unmoving, in front of it. As I told the court, just before she was crushed, Rachel briefly stood on top of the rolling mound of earth which had gathered in front of the bulldozer: her head was above the level of the blade, and just a few meters from the driver."

Joe Carr, an American ISM activist who used the assumed name of Joseph Smith during his time in Gaza, gave the following account in an affidavit recorded and published by the Palestinian Centre for Human Rights (PCHR):

Still wearing her fluorescent jacket, she sat down at least 15 meters in front of the bulldozer, and began waving her arms and shouting, just as activists had successfully done dozens of times that day.
The bulldozer continued driving forward headed straight for Rachel. When it got so close that it was moving the earth beneath her, she climbed onto the pile of rubble being pushed by the bulldozer. She got so high onto it that she was at eye-level with the cab of the bulldozer. Her head and upper torso were above the bulldozer’s blade, and the bulldozer driver and co-operator could clearly see her. Despite this, he continued forward, which pulled her legs into the pile of rubble, and pulled her down out of view of the driver. If he'd stopped at this point, he may have only broken her legs, but he continued forward, which pulled her underneath the bulldozer. We ran towards him, and waved our arms and shouted, one activist with a megaphone. But the bulldozer driver continued forward, until Rachel was underneath the cab of the bulldozer. (Note: BAROUD, R., & Kathleen. (2006). The Second Palestinian Intifada: A Chronicle of a People’s Struggle. Pluto Press. https://doi.org/10.2307/j.ctt18fs5q8 https://yplus.ps/wp-content/uploads/2021/01/Baroud-Ramzy-The-Second-Palestinian-Intifada-A-Chronicle-of-a-Peoples-Struggle.pdf Quotation: "The thorough account of Joseph Smith, a peace activist from Kansas who accompanied Rachel in Rafah")

On March 18, 2003, two days after Corrie's death, Joe (Smith) Carr was interviewed by British Channel 4 and The Observer reporter Sandra Jordan for a documentary, The Killing Zone, which aired in June 2003. He stated, "It was either a really gross mistake or a really brutal murder." According to The Seattle Times, "Smith, who witnessed Sunday's incident, said it began when Corrie sat down in front of the bulldozer. He said the operator scooped her up with a pile of earth, dumped her on the ground and ran over her twice." However, "Smith" later acknowledged that after Corrie fell down the dirt pile, the bulldozer operator could well have lost sight of Corrie.

=== Israeli accounts ===
The bulldozer operator was interviewed on Israeli TV and insisted he had no idea she was in front of him: "You can't hear, you can't see well. You can go over something and you'll never know. I scooped up some earth, I couldn't see anything. I pushed the earth, and I didn't see her at all. Maybe she was hiding in there." The IDF produced a video about Corrie's death that includes footage taken from inside the cockpit of a D9. The video makes a "credible case", wrote Joshua Hammer in Mother Jones, that "the operators, peering out through narrow, double-glazed, bulletproof windows, their view obscured behind pistons and the giant scooper, might not have seen Corrie kneeling in front of them".

In April 2011, during the trial of the civil suit brought by Corrie's parents, an IDF officer testified that Corrie and other activists had spent hours trying to block the bulldozers under his command. He went on to say that it was a war zone "where Palestinian militants used abandoned homes as firing positions and exploited foreign activists for cover". He shouted over a megaphone for the activists to leave, tried to use tear gas to disperse them and moved his troops several times. "To my regret, after the eighth time, (Corrie) hid behind an earth embankment. The D9 operator didn't see her. She thought he saw her," he said. An infantry major later testified that the activists were endangering troops and had ignored numerous warnings to leave the area. The judge in the Corrie case asserted that between September 2000 and the date of Corrie's death, Israeli forces in the area had been subjected to 1,400 attacks involving gunfire, 150 involving explosive devices, 200 involving anti-tank rockets, and 6,000 involving hand grenades or mortar fire.

=== Autopsy ===
Israeli prime minister Ariel Sharon promised United States president George W. Bush a "thorough, credible, and transparent investigation". Later, Captain Jacob Dallal, a spokesman for the Israeli army, called Corrie's death a "regrettable accident" and said that she and the other ISM activists were "a group of protesters who were acting very irresponsibly, putting everyone in danger—the Palestinians, themselves and our forces—by intentionally placing themselves in a combat zone". An autopsy was conducted on March 24 at the Abu Kabir Forensic Institute in Tel Aviv by Chief Pathologist Yehuda Hiss. The final report was not released publicly, but in their report on the matter Human Rights Watch says a copy was provided to them by Craig Corrie, with a translation supplied by the U.S. Department of State. In the report they quote Hiss as concluding, "Her death was caused by pressure on the chest (mechanical asphyxiation) with fractures of the ribs and vertebrae of the dorsal spinal column and scapulas, and tear wounds in the right lung with hemorrhaging of the pleural cavities."

=== Military investigation ===
The Israeli army's report seen by The Guardian said:

The army was searching for explosives in the border zone when Corrie was "struck as she stood behind a mound of earth that was created by an engineering vehicle operating in the area and she was hidden from the view of the vehicle's operator who continued with his work. Corrie was struck by dirt and a slab of concrete resulting in her death.... The finding of the operational investigations shows that Rachel Corrie was not run over by an engineering vehicle but rather was struck by a hard object, most probably a slab of concrete which was moved or slid down while the mound of earth which she was standing behind was moved.

— The Guardian, April 14, 2003.

On June 26, 2003, The Jerusalem Post quoted an Israeli military spokesman as saying that Corrie had not been run over and that the operator had not seen her:

The driver at no point saw or heard Corrie. She was standing behind debris which obstructed the view of the driver and the driver had a very limited field of vision due to the protective cage he was working in ... The driver and his commanders were interrogated extensively over a long period of time with the use of polygraph tests and video evidence. They had no knowledge that she was standing in the path of the tractor. An autopsy of Corrie's body revealed that the cause of death was from falling debris and not from the tractor physically rolling over her. It was a tragic accident that never should have happened.

Howard Blume told that IDF stated:

[a bulldozer with 2 crews] was engaged in "routine terrain leveling and debris clearing", not building demolition. Quoting from the IDF report, Corrie died "as a result of injuries sustained when earth and debris accidentally fell on her ... Ms. Corrie was not run over by the bulldozer," he added, IDF also claimed she was possibly "in a blindspot for the bulldozer operators and "behind an earth mound", so they did not see that she was in harm's way.

In later IDF operations, the house was damaged (a hole was knocked in a wall) and was later destroyed. By that time, the Nasrallah family had moved into a different house. It was reported in 2006 that the house that Corrie was trying to protect was rebuilt with funds raised by The Rebuilding Alliance. A spokesman for the IDF told the Guardian that while it did not accept responsibility for Corrie's death, it intended to change its operational procedures to avoid similar incidents in the future. The level of command of similar operations would be raised, said the spokesman, and civilians in the area would be dispersed or arrested before operations began. Observers will be deployed and CCTV cameras will be installed on the bulldozers to compensate for blind spots, which may have contributed to Corrie's death.

The IDF gave copies of the report, titled "The Death of Rachel Corrie", to members of the U.S. Congress in April 2003, and Corrie's family released the document to the media in June 2003, according to the Gannett News Service. In March 2004, the family said that the entire report had not been released, and that only they and two American staffers at the U.S. Embassy in Tel Aviv had been allowed to view it. The family said they were allowed to look at the report in the Consulate General of Israel to the Pacific Northwest in San Francisco. The ISM rejected the Israeli report, stating that it contradicted their members' eyewitness reports and that the investigation had not been credible and transparent.

== Reactions ==
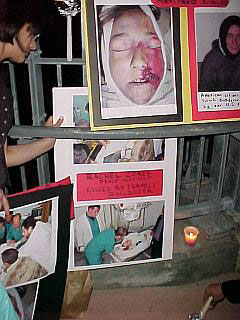
A Palestinian memorial

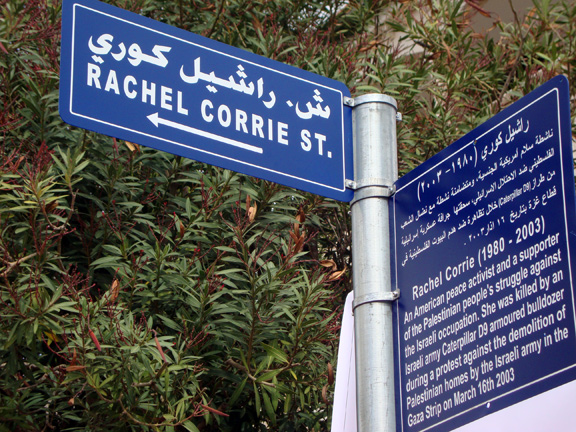
The municipality of Ramallah in the West Bank dedicated a street to Rachel Corrie

=== Corrie's parents' reaction ===
In 2012, Corrie's father, Craig Corrie said "I know there's stuff you can't see out of the double glass windows." But he has denied that as a valid excuse, saying "you're responsible for knowing what's in front of your blade... It's a no brainer that this was gross negligence". He added that "they had three months to figure out how to deal with the activists that were there."

=== Political reactions ===
In March 2003, U.S. Representative Brian Baird introduced a resolution in the United States Congress calling on the U.S. government to "undertake a full, fair, and expeditious investigation" into Corrie's death. The House of Representatives took no action on the resolution. The Corrie family joined Representative Baird in calling for a U.S. investigation. Yasser Arafat, the first president of the Palestinian Authority, offered his condolences and gave the "blessings of the Palestinian people" to Corrie, promising to name a street in Gaza after her. According to Cindy Corrie, Arafat told Craig Corrie that Rachel Corrie "is your daughter but she is also the daughter of all Palestinians. She is ours too now."

On March 21, 2003, the Green Party of the United States called for an investigation of the "murder of American Peace Activist Rachel Corrie by Israeli Forces". In August 2012, U.S. Ambassador to Israel Dan Shapiro stated that the Israeli investigation was not satisfactory, and was not as thorough, credible or transparent as it should have been. Shapiro said further that the government of the United States is unsatisfied with the IDF's closure of its official investigation into Corrie's death.

=== Human rights organizations ===
Amnesty International called for an independent inquiry, with Christine Bustany, their advocacy director for the Middle East, saying, "U.S.-made bulldozers have been 'weaponized' and their transfer to Israel must be suspended." In 2005, Human Rights Watch published a report raising questions about the impartiality and professionalism of the IDF investigation. Some of the problems that the report mentioned were the investigators' lack of preparation, the "hostile", "inappropriate", and "mostly accusatory" questions they asked witnesses, the failure to ask witnesses to draw maps or to identify locations of events on maps, and their lack of interest in reconciling soldiers' testimonies with those of other eyewitnesses.

NGO Monitor, an Israeli group, strongly criticized other NGOs and said the verdict reflects all of the facts and circumstances surrounding the incident. Its president, Gerald Steinberg said, "Corrie's death was entirely unnecessary, and the leaders of the ISM bear much culpability for her death." A Catholic Worker house was named in her honor in Des Moines, Iowa.

=== Media ===
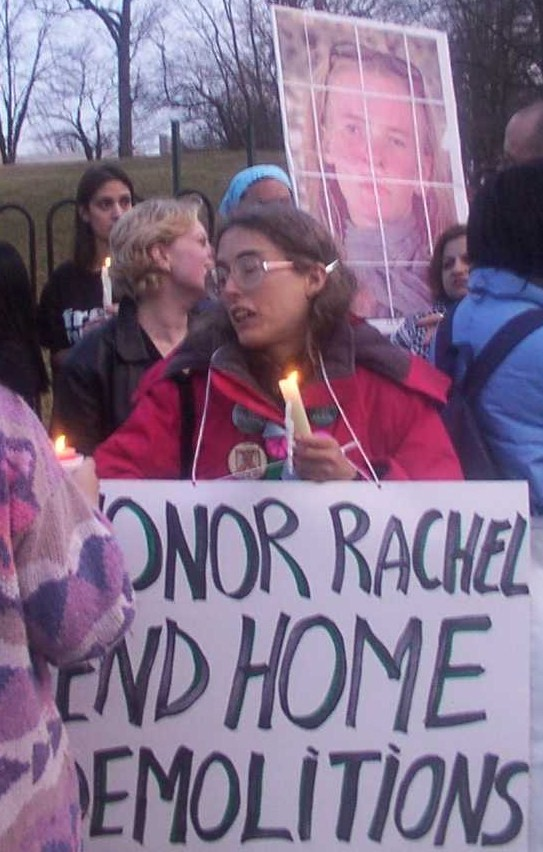
Rachel Corrie memorial vigil at Israeli Embassy in Washington, DC March 18, 2003

Sandra Jordan wrote in The Observer that because Corrie was American her death attracted more attention than the deaths of Palestinians under similar circumstances: "On the night of Corrie's death, nine Palestinians were killed in the Gaza Strip, among them a four-year-old girl and a man aged 90. A total of 220 people have died in Rafah since the beginning of the intifada. Palestinians know the death of one American receives more attention than the killing of hundreds of Muslims."

In 2006, Haaretz political columnist Bradley Burston said that Corrie's death was accidental but that "incidental killing is no less tragic than intentional killing"; Burston criticized both the pro-Palestinian and pro-Israeli sides for their excessive rhetoric:

Of all of the tragedies and casualties of the intifada, in which more than 4,000 people were killed over five years, the case of Rachel Corrie still stands apart, the subject of intense world interest and fierce debate.... Part of it starts with us. "They had no business being there" is no excuse for what the Pentagon long ago christened collateral damage. We've learned much. But we're still not there. We should have saved Rachel Corrie's life that day, either by sending out a spotter or delaying the bulldozer's work. Right now, somewhere in the West Bank, there's an eight-year-old whose life could be saved next week, if we've managed to learn the lesson and are resourceful enough to know how to apply it.

Charlie Wolf, formerly the Communications Director of Republicans Abroad UK, referred to Corrie as "scum" on his show on British radio station Talksport. Media regulator Ofcom ruled that this "seriously ill-judged" remark was in breach of the "Generally Accepted Standards" of Broadcasting.

=== Israeli court's justification ===
Explaining the Israeli court's ruling, judge Oded Gershon said Corrie's death was "the result of an accident she brought upon herself." Corrie was in a closed military area, with entry forbidden to civilians. The area was the site of daily gunfire by snipers, missile fire and IED explosions. The United States government had issued a travel warning against American citizens visiting the Gaza Strip. "She did not distance herself from the area, as any thinking person would have done," the judge ruled.

=== Role of the International Solidarity Movement ===
George Rishmawi, director of the Palestinian Center for Rapprochement between Peoples, told the San Francisco Chronicle that the ISM's main purpose is to "increase international awareness of Palestinian suffering through the involvement of foreign activists". He stated: "When Palestinians get shot by Israeli soldiers, no one is interested anymore ... [b]ut if some of these foreign volunteers get shot or even killed, then the international media will sit up and take notice." Joseph Smith, also known as Joseph Carr, stated: "We knew there was a risk ... but we also knew it never happened in the two years that we (the ISM) have been working here. I knew we take lots of precautions so that it doesn't happen, that if it did happen it would have to be an intentional act by a soldier, in which case it would bring a lot of publicity and significance to the cause."

=== Activities of Corrie's parents ===
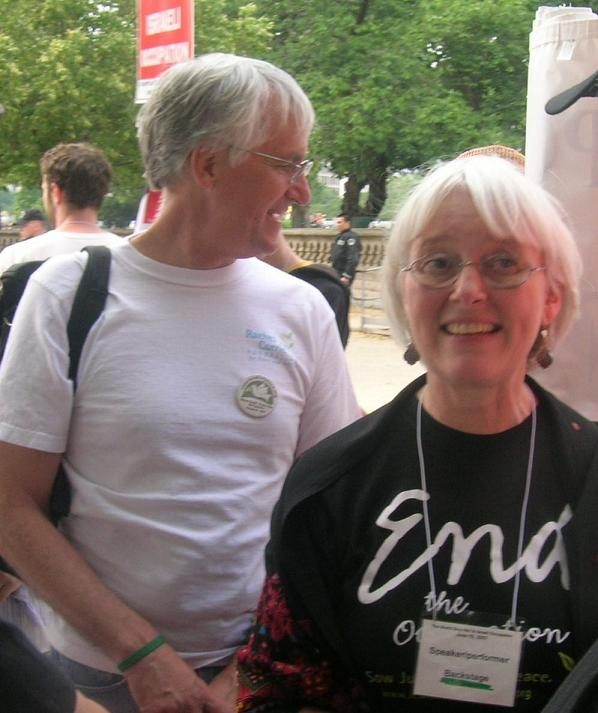
Craig and Cindy Corrie at an "End the Occupation" rally, 2007

Since their daughter's death, Corrie's parents, Cindy and Craig, have spent time trying to "promote peace and raise awareness about the plight of Palestinians", and continue what they believe to be her work. The Corries have worked to set up the "Rachel Corrie Foundation for Peace and Justice" and launched projects in memory of their daughter. They have also advanced investigation into the incident and asked the U.S. Congress and various courts for redress.

Corrie's parents have visited the region several times since their daughter's death and have twice visited Gaza. Following their daughter's death, they visited Gaza and Israel, seeing the place where she died, and meeting ISM members and Palestinians whom she had known. They also visited Ramallah in the West Bank, where Arafat met them and presented them with a plaque in memory of their daughter. On March 28, 2008, they addressed a demonstration in Ramallah at which Craig Corrie said: "This village has become a symbol of nonviolent resistance. I call for solidarity with the people of Palestine in resisting the conditions imposed by the Israeli occupation to prevent the establishment of their state."

The Nasrallahs, whose home Rachel Corrie allegedly believed she was preventing from destruction, toured with the Corries across the United States in June 2005. The aim of the trip was, with the cooperation of the Rebuilding Alliance, to raise funds to rebuild the Nasrallah home and other homes destroyed in Rafah. In January 2011, Corrie's parents visited the MV Mavi Marmara in Turkey, together with the head of the IHH Bülent Yıldırım. Cindy Corrie called dead Mavi Marmara activists "martyrs" and compared them to her daughter.

After the outbreak of the Gaza war in 2023, the couple referred to the situation as genocide against Palestinian people and have been trying to keep in touch with Palestinians on the ground. Following the killing of Aysenur Eygi in 2024, Corrie's parents called for an inquiry into the death. Craig Corrie remarked that there were "so many similarities" between the killing of Eygi, who was shot dead by the Israel Defense Forces while protesting Israeli settlement expansion in the West Bank, and the death of his daughter.

== Subsequent events ==
=== Lawsuits ===
==== In the United States ====
Corrie v. Caterpillar Inc
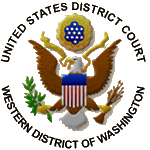
- Court: United States District Court for the Western District of Washington
- Started: March 15, 2005; 21 years ago
- Docket nos.: 3:05-cv-05192 (W.D. Wash.); 05-36210 (9th Cir.)

Case history
- Appealed to: United States Court of Appeals for the Ninth Circuit

Outcome
- Dismissed on November 22, 2005

Court membership
- Judge sitting: Frank Burgess

Corrie's family and several Palestinians filed a federal lawsuit against Caterpillar Inc. in the U.S. District Court for the Western District of Washington alleging liability for Corrie's death. The suit alleged Caterpillar supplied the bulldozers to the Israelis despite having notice they would be used to further "a policy plaintiffs contend violates international law". The case was dismissed by a Federal judge in November 2005 for lack of subject matter jurisdiction, citing, among other things, the political question doctrine. The judge found, alternatively, that the plaintiffs' claims failed on the merits.

The Corrie family appealed to the United States Court of Appeals for the Ninth Circuit. In September 2007 the Ninth Circuit affirmed the dismissal on the political question grounds and thus did not rule on the merits of the suit. The Court found that as the bulldozers were paid for by the U.S. Government as part of its aid to Israel, the Judicial Branch could not rule on the merits of the case without ruling on whether or not the government's financing of such bulldozers was appropriate and that this was a matter not entrusted to the Judicial Branch.

==== In Israel ====
In 2010, Corrie's parents, represented by Attorney Hussein Abu Hussein, filed a lawsuit against the Israel Defense Forces and the Israeli Defense Ministry in the Haifa District Court, seeking US$324,000 in compensation. The case began in Haifa on March 10, 2010. Judge Oded Gershon presided over the case. On October 21, 2010, the bulldozer driver who had run over Corrie testified for four hours, and was cross-examined by the Corries' attorney. At the request of state prosecutors, who argued that his life could be imperiled if he was publicly identified, the driver was hidden behind a screen and visible to only the judge and attorneys. A request by the Corrie family that they also be allowed to see the driver was turned down by the judge. The driver was identified only by his initials, "YB", and a gag order was imposed on identifying details, although it was disclosed in court that he was a 38-year old Russian immigrant who had arrived in Israel at age 23, and was working for a food processing company at the time. The driver denied having seen her before hitting her. In addition, four experts, including an expert on the behalf of the Corrie family testified during the trial, and concluded that the bulldozer driver could not see Corrie. Four ISM witnesses testified during the case. However, the Palestinian physician from Gaza who had examined Corrie's wounds on the scene was unable to testify after Israel refused him an entry visa and rejected an application for him to testify by video link.

The court ruled against Corrie's family on August 28, 2012. In a 62-page verdict, Judge Oded Gershon ruled that Corrie's death was an accident for which she was responsible, and absolved the IDF of any wrongdoing. The judge ruled that the bulldozer driver and his commander had a very limited field of vision and could not possibly have seen her. According to the judge "The mission of the IDF force on the day of the incident was solely to clear the ground.... The mission did not include, in any way, the demolition of homes." The court invoked the principle of the combatant activities exception, as the IDF was attacked in the same area where Corrie was killed a few hours earlier; that Corrie could have avoided the danger and that defendants were not at fault as there was neither intent nor negligence involved in her death. The judge said that the IDF did not violate Corrie's right to life because Corrie had placed herself in a dangerous situation, that Israel's investigation was appropriate and did not contain mistakes, and also criticized the U.S. government for failing to send a diplomatic representative to observe Corrie's autopsy. Gershon said: "I rule unequivocally that the claim that the deceased was intentionally hit by the bulldozer is totally baseless. This was an extremely unfortunate accident. I reached the conclusion that there was no negligence on the part of the bulldozer driver. I reject the suit. There is no justification to demand the state pay any damages. She [Corrie] did not distance herself from the area, as any thinking person would have done. She consciously put herself in harm's way."

Furthermore, Gershon pointed to three different entry bans, and also pointed out that the Philadelphi route was effectively a war zone and was formally declared a closed military zone when Corrie died. Gershon also noted that the United States had issued an Israel travel advisory warning to avoid Gaza and the West Bank. In addition, Gershon said that the ISM "abuses the human rights discourse to blur its actions which are de facto violence" and specialized in disrupting IDF activity, which "included an army of activists serving as 'human shields' for terrorists wanted by Israeli security forces, financial and logistical aid to Palestinians including terrorists and their families, and disruption of the sealing of suicide bombers' houses". The Corrie family lawyer, Hussein Abu Hussein, said they were "now studying our options", in regards to a possible appeal.

While rejecting the Corrie family's claims to damages, the judge also waived the Corrie family's court costs. Haifa District Court spokeswoman Nitzan Eyal said that her family could appeal the ruling. The amount sought was a symbolic US$1 and legal costs. Her mother reacted to the verdict in saying: "I am hurt. We are, of course, deeply saddened and deeply troubled by what we heard today from Judge Oded Gershon." Corrie's sister, Sarah Corrie Simpson, stated that she believed "without a doubt" that the driver had seen her as he approached, and stated that she hoped he would one day "have the courage" to tell the truth. The right wing political party Yisrael Beiteinu issued a statement that called the verdict "vindication after vilification".

Former UN Special Rapporteur on the occupied Palestinian Territories Richard Falk said of the verdict that it was "a sad outcome, above all for the Corrie family that had initiated the case back in 2005, but also for the rule of law and the hope that an Israeli court would place limits on the violence of the state, particularly in relation to innocents and unarmed civilians in an occupied territory". Former U.S. President Jimmy Carter of the Carter Center said that the "court's decision confirms a climate of impunity, which facilitates Israeli human rights violations against Palestinian civilians in the Occupied Territory". The verdict of the Haifa District Court was appealed to the Supreme Court of Israel on May 21, 2014. The Supreme Court rejected the appeal and upheld the District Court's verdict regarding the circumstances of Corrie's death, which cleared the IDF from wrongdoing.

=== Memorial events ===
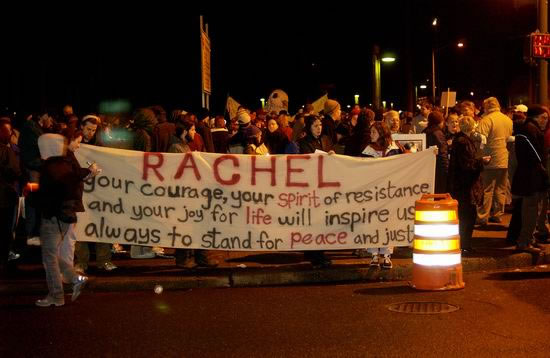
Vigil in Olympia, Washington

Immediately after her death, posters and graffiti praising Corrie were posted in Rafah, with one graffiti tag reading, "Rachel was an American citizen with Palestinian blood." According to the ISM's official publications, the day after Corrie died, about thirty American and European ISM activists with 300 Palestinians began protests during the public memorial service over the spot where she was fatally injured in Rafah. Gordon Murray, an ISM activist who attended the memorial, states that the IDF sent a representative to the event who intimidated the mourners into dispersing, allegedly using non-lethal weapons.

In 2008, Corrie's parents commemorated the fifth anniversary of her death at an event held in the West Bank town of Nablus. About 150 Palestinians and foreigners joined them to dedicate a memorial to Corrie on one of the city's streets. In 2011, Iran named a street in Tehran after Corrie.

=== Artistic tributes ===
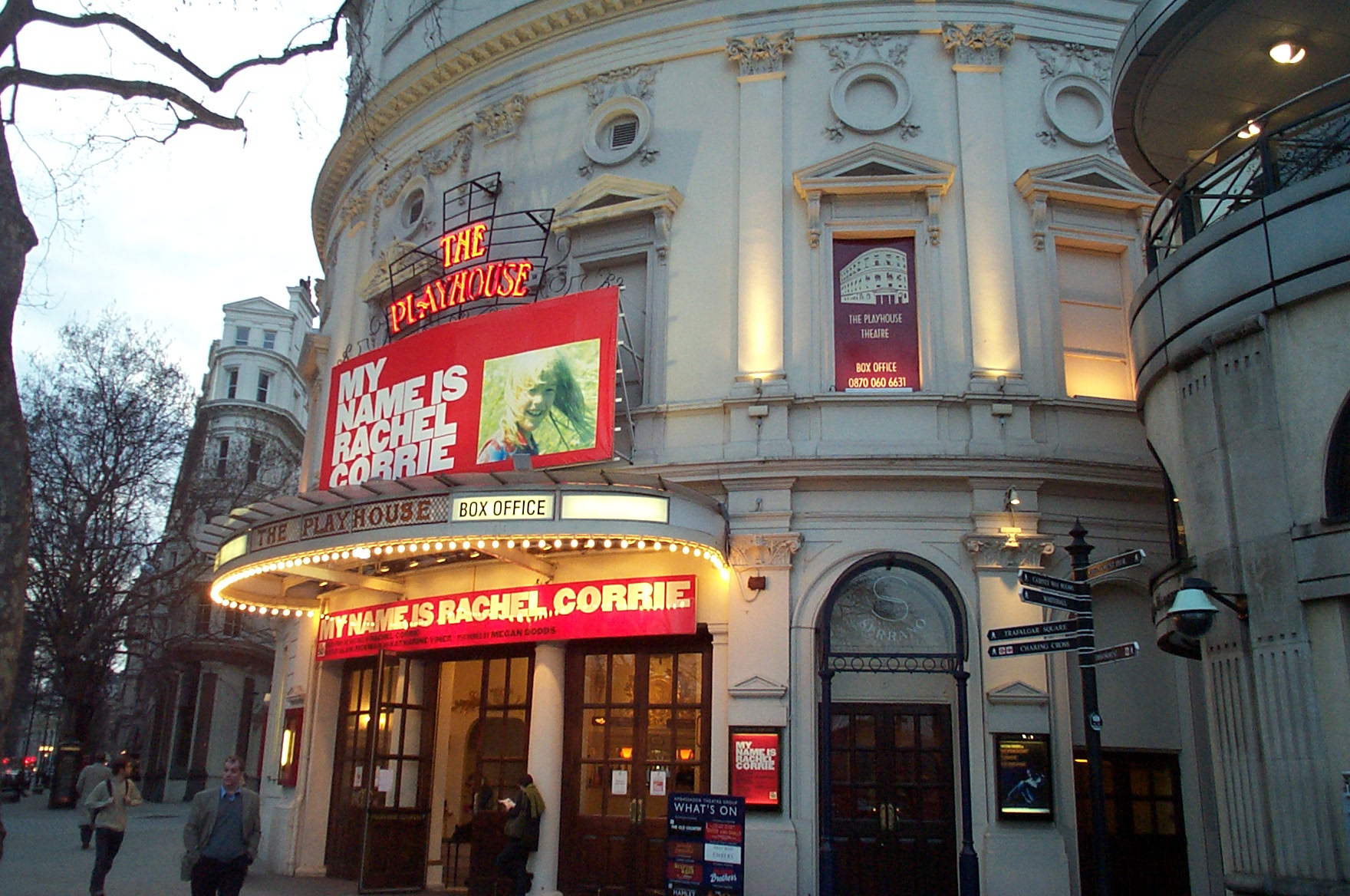
My Name Is Rachel Corrie at Playhouse Theatre, London, 2006.

In 2004, Alaska composer Philip Munger wrote a cantata about Corrie called The Skies are Weeping, which was scheduled to premiere on April 27 at the University of Alaska Anchorage, where Munger teaches. After objections to the upcoming performance were received, including from members of the Jewish community, a forum was held co-chaired by Munger and a local rabbi who claimed the work "romanticized terrorism". After the forum "disintegrate[d]", Munger announced, "I cannot subject 16 students ... to any possibility of physical harm or to the type of character assassination some of us are already undergoing. Performance of The Skies are Weeping at this time and place is withdrawn for the safety of the student performers." Munger later related that he had received threatening e-mails whose content he considered was "[just] short of what you'd take to the troopers", and that some of his students had received similar communications. The cantata was eventually performed at the Hackney Empire theatre in London, premiering on November 1, 2005.

In early 2005, My Name Is Rachel Corrie, a play composed from Corrie's journals and emails from Gaza and compiled by actor Alan Rickman and journalist Katharine Viner, in a production directed by Rickman, was presented in London and later revived in October 2005. The play was to be transferred to the New York Theatre Workshop, but when it was postponed indefinitely, the British producers denounced the decision as censorship and withdrew the show. It finally opened Off-Broadway on October 15, 2006, for an initial run of 48 performances. In the same year, My Name Is Rachel Corrie was shown at the Pleasance theatre as part of the Edinburgh (Fringe) Festival. The play has also been published as a paperback, and performed in ten countries, including Israel.

Singer Billy Bragg recounted Corrie's death in the song "The Lonesome Death of Rachel Corrie", composed to the tune of Bob Dylan's "The Lonesome Death of Hattie Carroll". After being originally released as a free digital download, it was included on the album Fight Songs in 2011. Irish folk music/world music group Kíla included the instrumental "Rachel Corrie" on their 2015 album Suas Síos. In 2003, Pittsburgh singer Mike Stout wrote and composed a song about Rachel Corrie, which was included with other anti-war songs in his album "War and Resistance". Also in 2003, David Rovics wrote the song "The Death of Rachel Corrie", included on his album Return.

=== Documentaries ===
In 2003, British Channel 4 and The Observer reporter Sandra Jordan and producer Rodrigo Vasquez made a documentary that was aired June 2003 on Channel 4 titled The Killing Zone, about ongoing violence in the Gaza Strip. Jordan said: "There has been a lot of interest in Britain and around the world about what happened to Rachel, I find it highly disappointing that no serious American investigative journalist has taken Rachel's story seriously or questioned or challenged the Israeli Army version of events."

In 2005, the BBC produced a 60 minute documentary titled When Killing is Easy aka Shooting the Messenger, Why are foreigners suddenly under fire in Israel?, described as "a meticulous examination of" the shooting to death of James Miller, who was shot while filming in an Israeli war zone in May 2003; the shooting of British photography student Thomas Hurndall in April 2003, and the death of Corrie in March 2003. The documentary states that the attacks were not "random acts of violence", but rather "represent a culture of killing with impunity which is sanctioned by the higher echelons of the Israeli army."

Also in 2005, Yahya Barakat, who lectures on TV production, cinematography, and filmmaking at al-Quds University, filmed a documentary in Arabic with English subtitles, named Rachel Corrie – An American Conscience. In 2009, a documentary film titled Rachel is produced by Morocco-born French-Israeli director Simone Bitton detailing the death of Rachel Corrie from "an Israeli point of view". Its first North American public screening was at the 2009 Tribeca Film Festival.

=== MV Rachel Corrie ===
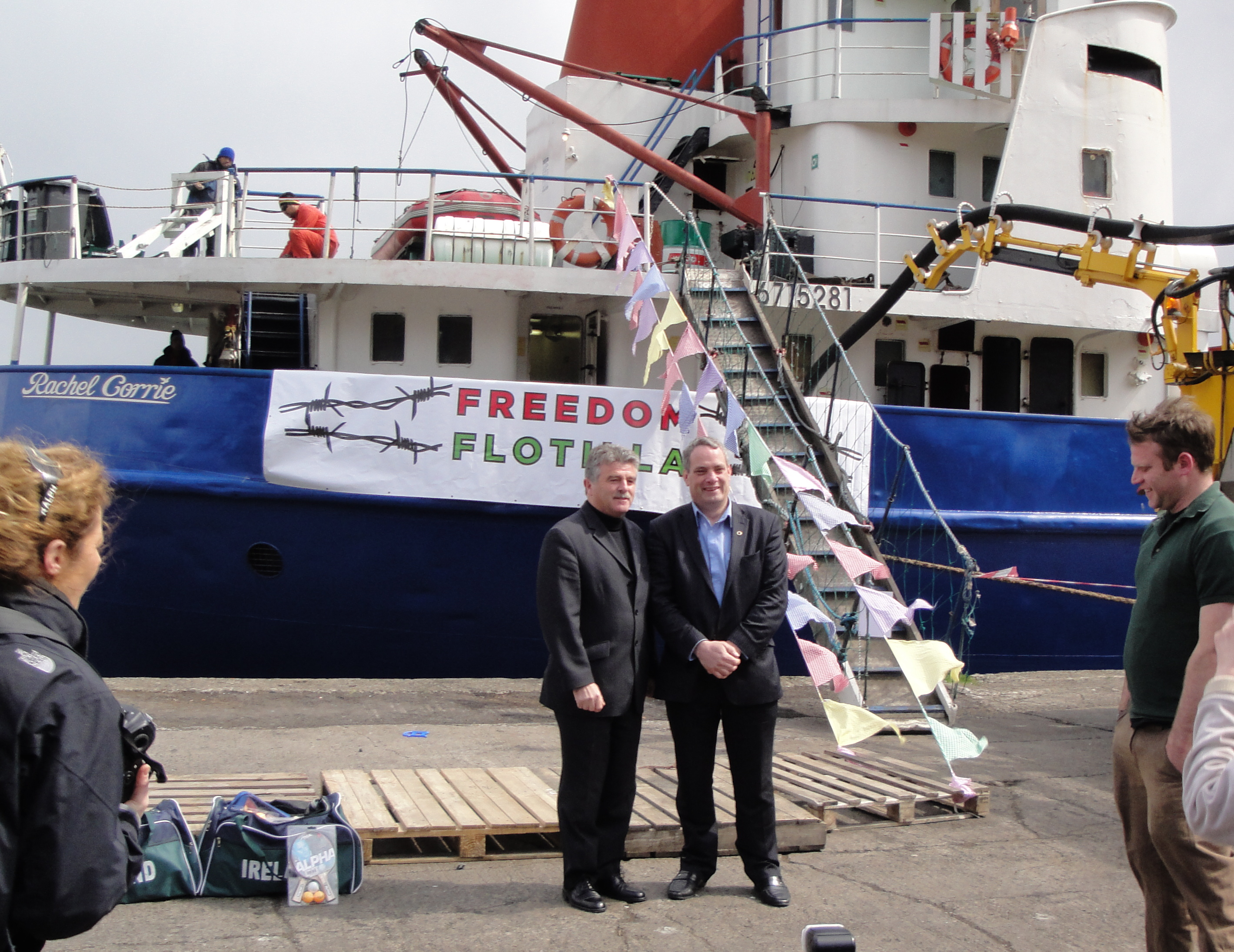
MV Rachel Corrie

On March 30, 2010, an 1800-tonne vessel was bought at auction in Dundalk, Ireland, for €70,000 by the Free Gaza Movement. It was outfitted for use in a voyage to Gaza, named in honour of Rachel Corrie and launched May 12, 2010. It sailed to join a flotilla intended to break the blockade of the Gaza Strip. The flotilla was intercepted; however, the MV Rachel Corrie had not reached the other ships and continued towards Gaza by itself. Israeli navy officers addressed the ship as "Linda"—the vessel's name before it was renamed for Rachel Corrie. The ship was intercepted by the Israeli navy on Saturday, June 5, 2010, 23 miles off the coast, and diverted to the port of Ashdod. There the cargo was to be inspected and sent over land to Gaza.

=== Symbolic gravestone in Iran ===
On the twelfth anniversary of Corrie's death, a symbolic gravestone with her name was installed in the Tehran cemetery to honor her by the Commemoration of Martyrs of movement of the Islamic World's Staff. Near her symbolic gravestone are twelve other symbolic gravestones.

=== Revelation of Caterpillar surveillance ===
In 2017, documents emerged that showed Caterpillar had hired private investigators to spy on the family of Rachel Corrie following her killing in early 2003.

=== Parents' lawsuit ===
In 2005, Corrie's parents filed a civil lawsuit, charging the Israeli state with not conducting a full and credible investigation into the case and therefore holding responsibility for her death. They contended that either she had been intentionally killed or the Israeli soldiers on scene had acted with reckless neglect. They sued for a symbolic US$1 in damages. However, an Israeli court rejected their suit in August 2012 and upheld the results of the military's investigation, ruling that the Israeli government was not responsible for Corrie's death, again attracting criticism from Amnesty International, HRW, and various activists. An appeal against this ruling was heard on May 21, 2014, but was ultimately rejected by the Supreme Court of Israel on February 14, 2015.

=== May 2024 arson attack ===
During the ongoing Gaza war protests in the United States, a presumably pro-Palestinian group calling itself "Rachel Corrie's Ghost Brigade" reported that it had cut through a fence at a Portland police facility and burned 17 police cars on 2 May 2024.

== Bibliography ==
- Let Me Stand Alone, collected writings and memoirs of Rachel Corrie published in January 2008 by W. W. Norton & Company, ISBN 978-0-393-06571-8.
- Corrie, Rachel. "Letter from Palestine". Voices of a People's History of the United States. Ed. Howard Zinn and Anthony Arnove. New York: Seven Stories Press. pp. 609–610. ISBN 978-1-58322-628-5.

== See also ==
- ISM casualties in Palestine and Israel
- Iain Hook – British UNRWA project manager shot and killed by IDF during a battle in Jenin, November 22, 2002.
- James Miller – British film-maker shot and killed by the IDF in Gaza, May 2, 2003.
- Vittorio Arrigoni – Italian ISM volunteer abducted and murdered in Gaza by a Salafist militant group.
- Kayla Mueller – American activist and aid worker abducted by ISIS and later killed.
- Pippa Bacca – Italian peace activist raped and murdered in Turkey.
- Bruce W. Klunder – American minister run over by a bulldozer while protesting segregation
- List of peace activists
