= Nitaf =

Nitaf نطاف Nataf
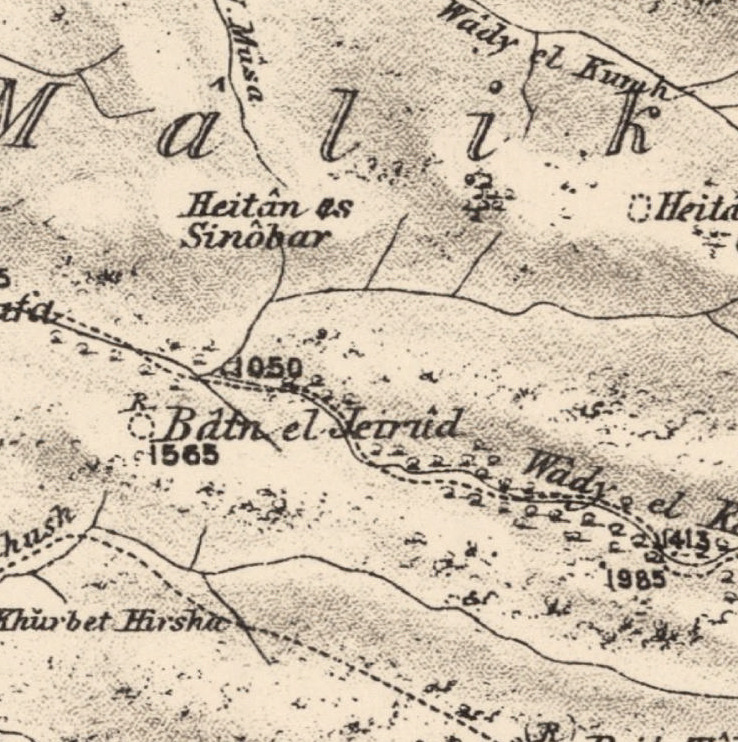
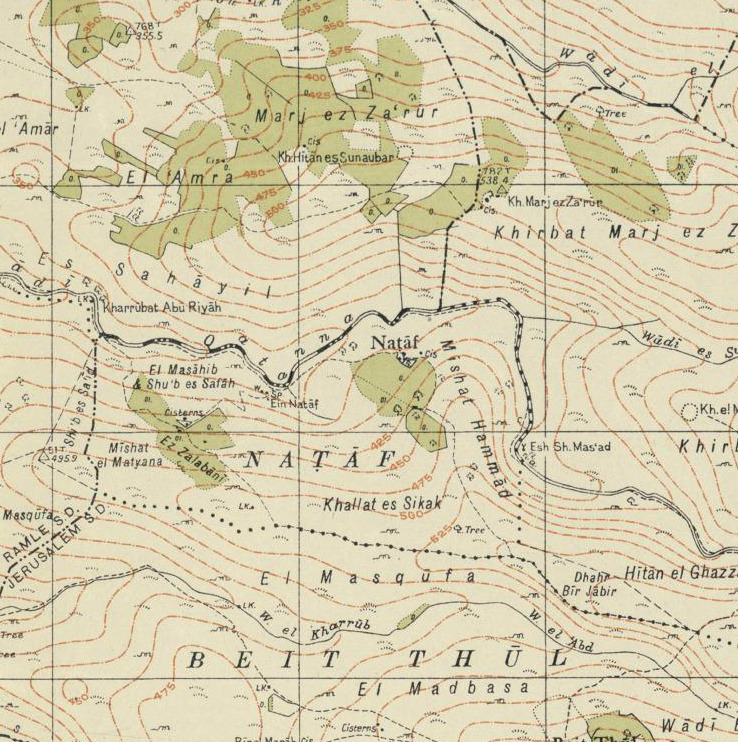
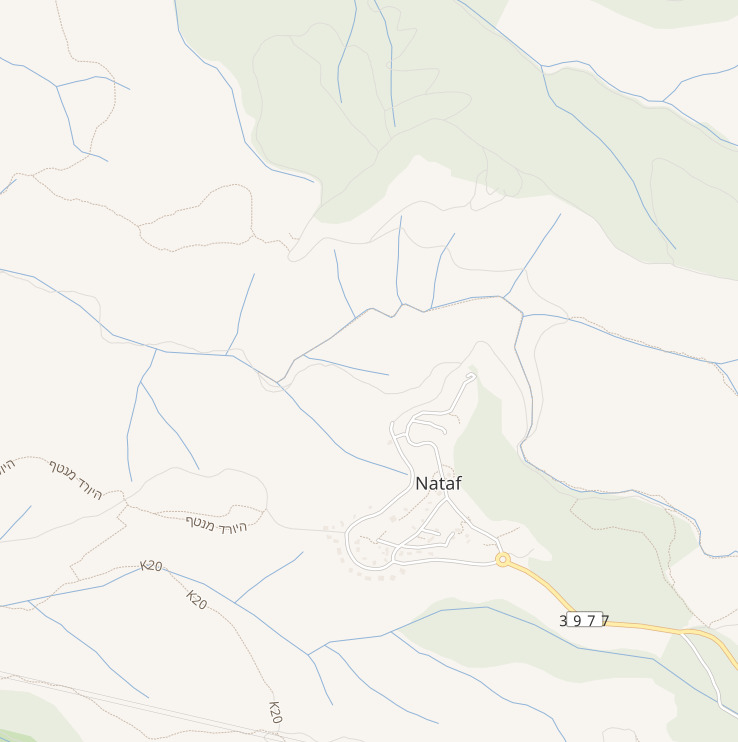
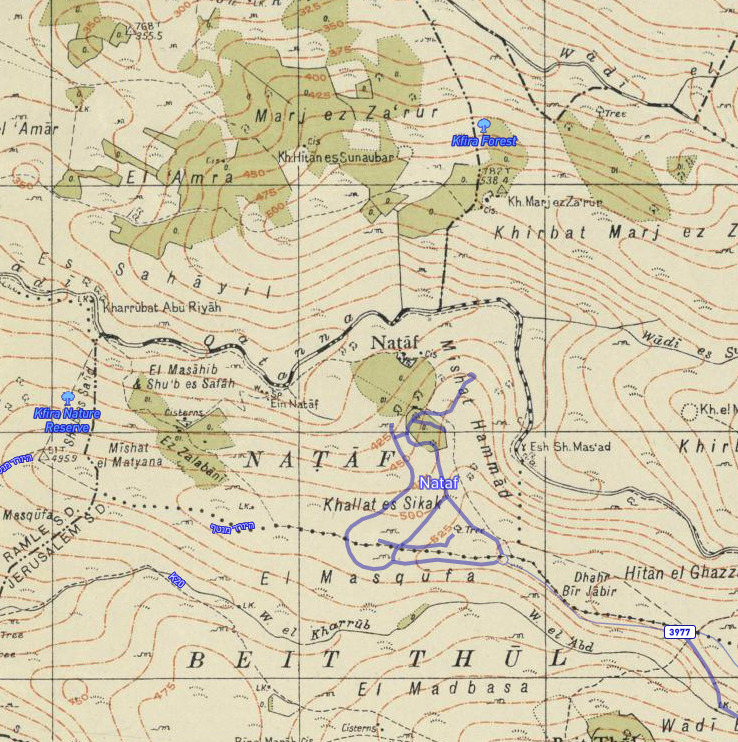
- 1870s map 1940s map modern map 1940s with modern overlay map A series of historical maps of the area around Nitaf (click the buttons)

- Location within Mandatory Palestine
- Coordinates: 31°50′13″N 35°03′55″E
- Palestine grid: 156/138
- Geopolitical entity: Mandatory Palestine
- Subdistrict: Jerusalem
- Date of depopulation: 15 April 1948

Area
  - Total: 1,401 dunams (1.401 km^{2}; 0.541 sq mi)

Population (1945)
  - Total: 40

Nitaf (Arabic: نطاف, Natâf) was a small, short-lived Palestinian Arab village in the Jerusalem Subdistrict. It was established in the early 20th century. It was forcefully depopulated during the 1947–1948 Civil War in Mandatory Palestine on April 15, 1948, during the second stage of Operation Dani. It was located 17 km west of Jerusalem, just north of Bayt Thul.

The Israeli village of Nataf was built in 1982, south of the ruins of Nitaf.

== History ==
In the 1922 census of Palestine, conducted by the British Mandate authorities, Nataf had a population 16, all Muslims. In the 1931 census it was counted with Qatanna, together they had 875 Muslim inhabitants, in 233 houses. It was then considered a khirbet belonging to Qatanna.

In the 1945 statistics it had a population of 40 Muslims, and the total land area was 1,401 dunams, according to an official land and population survey. Of the land, a total of 166 dunams were plantations and irrigable land and 158 were for cereals, while a total of 1,077 dunams were classified non-cultivable land.

Nitaf had a maqam for local sage known as al-Shaykh Mas'ud.

=== 1948 and aftermath ===
The village was depopulated on 15 April 1948, during the 1948 Palestine war.

Following the war, the area was incorporated into the State of Israel. The village of Nataf, established in 1982, is located less than 1 km south of the village site. According to Walid Khalidi on land belonging to Bayt Thul, but other sources, including Davar say the land was bought from Abu Ghosh.

In 1992, the village site was described: "There is a large, deserted stone house on the site surrounded by old terraces. It is a one-storey house with an arched door and arched windows. Northwest of this house, at the bottom of a slope, stands another deserted house. Most of the village lands fell within the Demilitarized Zone that was delineated by the armistice agreement of 1949 between Israel and Jordan."

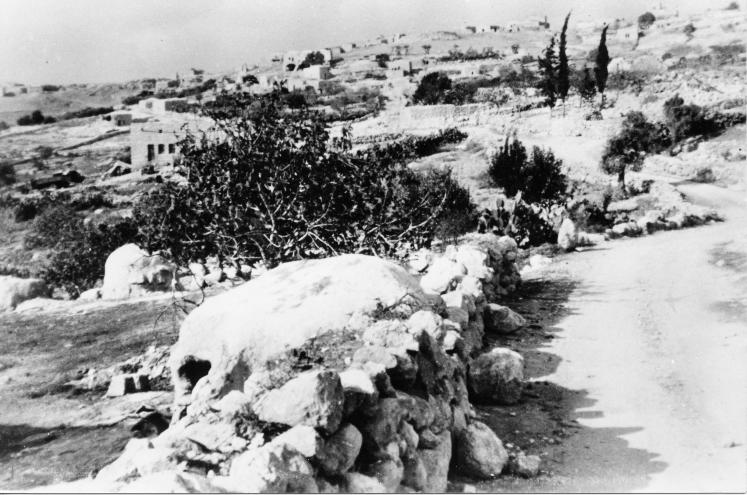
Nitaf 1948

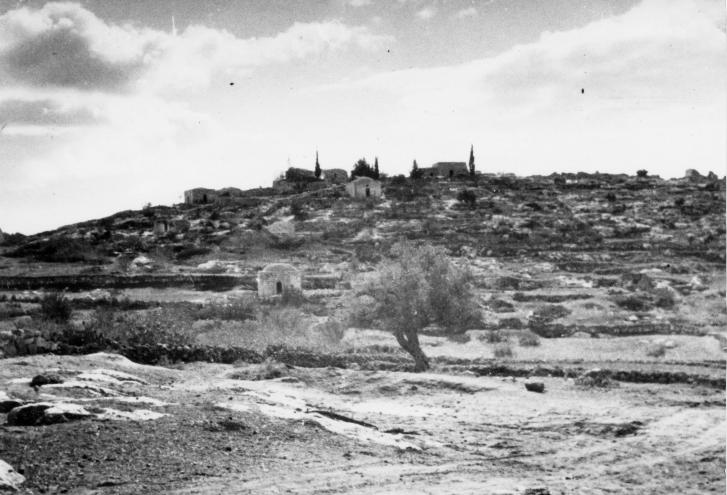
View of Nitaf before demolition, 1948

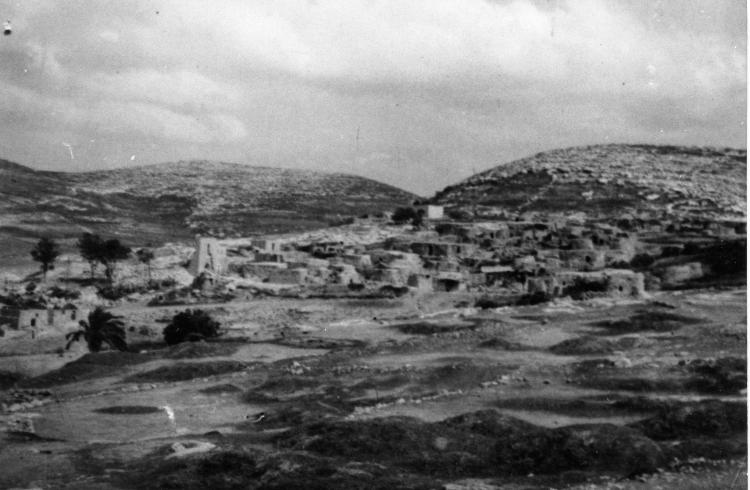
Nitaf after occupation, 1948

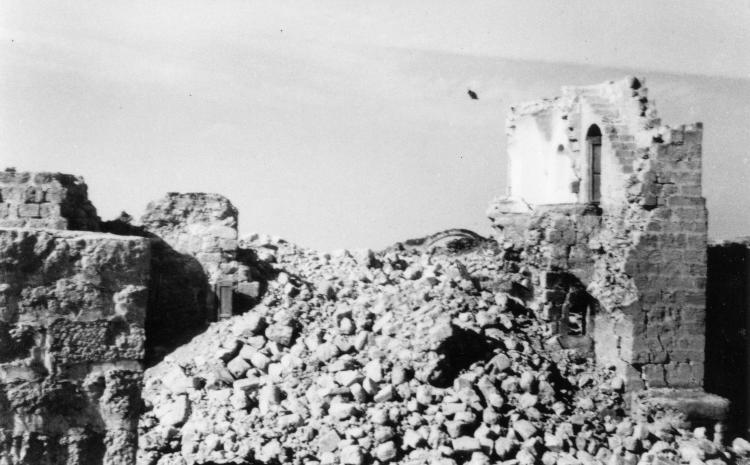
Demolished building following conquest by Harel Brigade 1948

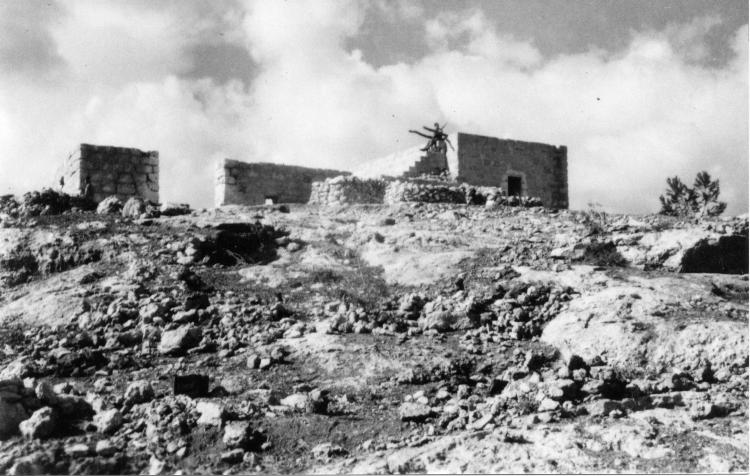
Nitaf during demolition

== Bibliography ==
- Barron, J. B., ed. (1923). Palestine: Report and General Abstracts of the Census of 1922. Government of Palestine.
- Esber, R. (2008). Under the Cover of War, The Zionist Expulsions of the Palestinians. Arabicus Books & Media. ISBN 978-0-9815131-7-1.
- Government of Palestine, Department of Statistics (1945). Village Statistics, April, 1945.
- Hadawi, S. (1970). Village Statistics of 1945: A Classification of Land and Area ownership in Palestine. Palestine Liberation Organization Research Center.
- Khalidi, W. (1992). All That Remains: The Palestinian Villages Occupied and Depopulated by Israel in 1948. Washington D.C.: Institute for Palestine Studies. ISBN 0-88728-224-5.
- Mills, E., ed. (1932). Census of Palestine 1931. Population of Villages, Towns and Administrative Areas. Jerusalem: Government of Palestine.
