= Rachel (2009 film) =

- Directed by: Simone Bitton
- Written by: Simone Bitton
- Produced by: Thierry Lenouvel
- Starring: Rachel Corrie
- Cinematography: Jacques Bouquin
- Edited by: Jean-Michel Perez; Catherine Poitevin
- Distributed by: Women Make Movies
- Release date: 2009
- Running time: 100 min.
- Countries: France, Belgium

Rachel is a 2009 documentary film by Simone Bitton detailing the death of Rachel Corrie (1979–2003). Corrie was an American activist and diarist. A member of the pro-Palestinian group International Solidarity Movement (ISM), she was crushed to death by an Israel Defense Forces (IDF) armored bulldozer in a southern Gaza Strip combat zone at the height of the second Palestinian intifada under contested circumstances.

The documentary premiered at Berlin Film Festival in February 2009. "Rachel is an in-depth cinematic investigation into the death of an unknown young girl, made with a rigor and scope normally reserved for first-rate historical characters. It gives voice to all the people involved in Rachel’s story, from Palestinian and foreign witnesses to Israeli military spokespersons and investigators, doctors, activists and soldiers linked to the affair. The film begins like a classic documentary, but soon develops, transcending its subject and transforming into a cinematographic meditation on youth, war, idealism and political utopia. In the beginning, there is this: she was called Rachel Corrie. She was 23. She was convinced that her American nationality would be enough to make her an effective human shield, that her simple presence would save lives, olive trees, wells and houses."

Simone Bitton: "I suppose that I initiated the project of Rachel as an attempt to cleanse myself of this shame: I wanted to film in Gaza because I know that if filmmakers stop filming in places where they are not welcome, not only will it become easier for occupation forces everywhere to kill and destroy – but also documentary cinema itself will die – and only the TV news media spectacle of war will remain."

The first North American public screening was at the 2009 Tribeca Film Festival. It is said the film reports the case from "an Israeli point of view". But a controversy arose with respect to the showing of the film at the 2009 San Francisco Jewish Film Festival, and the festival's extending an invitation to Corrie's mother to speak. Jewish Voice for Peace, the film's sponsor, was called "anti-Semitic" by the festival managers.
