= Let Me Stand Alone =

2008 book by Rachel Corrie (posthumous)

- Author: Rachel Corrie
- Language: English
- Genre: Collected writings, letters and diaries
- Publisher: W. W. Norton & Company
- Publication date: 2008
- Publication place: United States
- ISBN: 0393065715

Let Me Stand Alone is a book containing collected writings, including diaries and letters, of Rachel Corrie, published by W. W. Norton & Company in 2008. Corrie was killed in 2003 by an Israel Defense Forces armored bulldozer while protesting the destruction of a Gaza house which belonged to a Palestinian doctor.

According to W. W. Norton & Company,

How do we find our way in the world? How do our actions affect others? What do we owe the rest of humanity? These are the timeless questions so eloquently posed by Rachel Corrie, a young American activist killed on March 16, 2003, as she tried to block the demolition of a Palestinian family's home in the Gaza Strip.
The "collection of her journal entries opens a window on the maturation of a young woman seeking to make the world a better place."

== Literature ==
- Rachel Corrie, Let Me Stand Alone, W. W. Norton & Company, 2008, ISBN 0393065715
