= Nataf =

Nataf: נטף (Hebrew)
- Community settlement
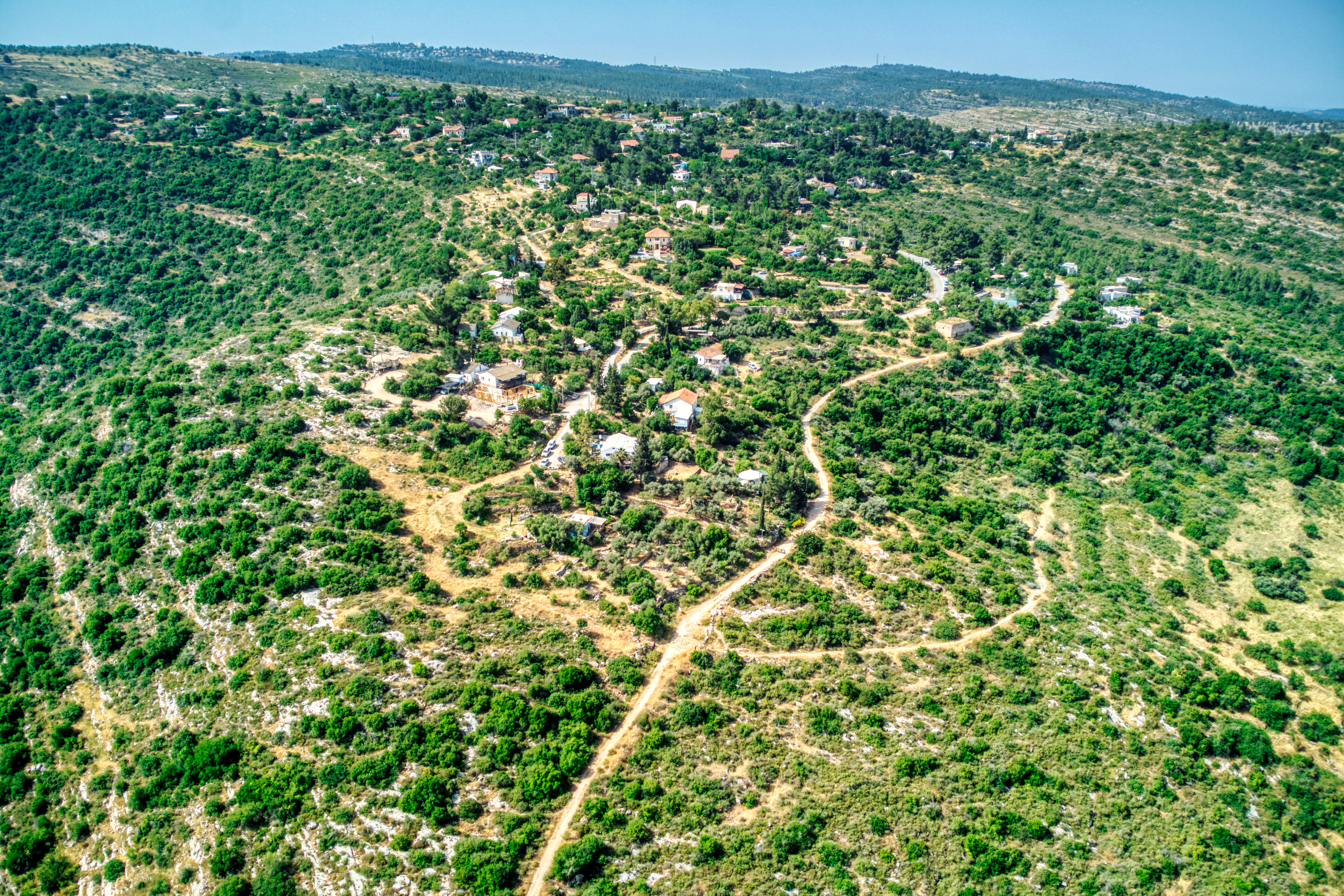
- Nataf

- Location within Jerusalem District
- Coordinates: 31°49′56″N 35°4′4″E
- Country: Israel
- District: Jerusalem
- Council: Mateh Yehuda
- Founded: 1982
- Population (2024): 495
- Website: nataf.co

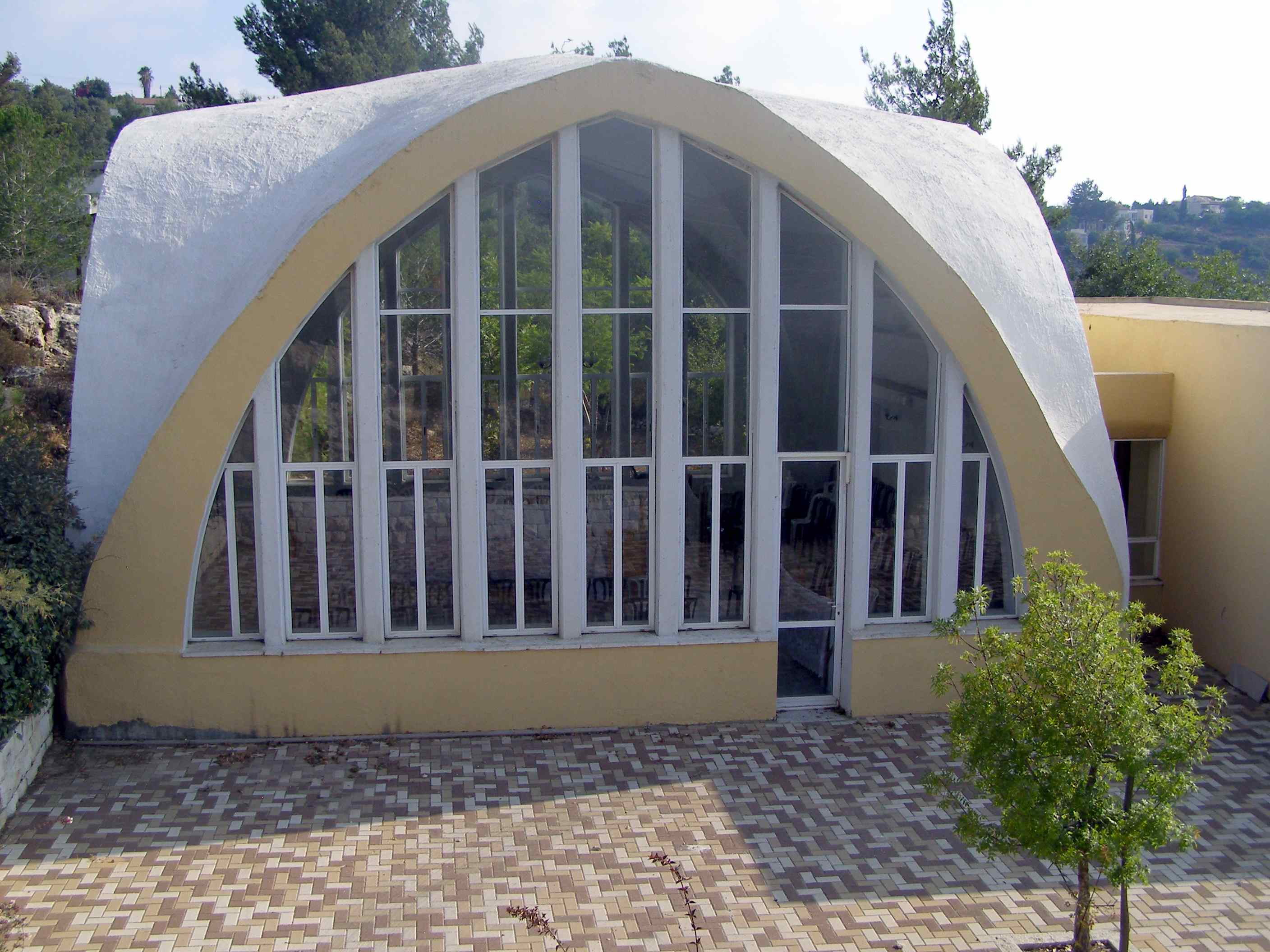
Village synagogue

Nataf (Hebrew: נָטָף, lit. Stacte) is a community settlement in central Israel. Located in the Judean Mountains, 12 miles (19 km) west of Jerusalem, it falls under the jurisdiction of Mateh Yehuda Regional Council. In 2024 it had a population of 495.

== Etymology ==
Its biblical name is adopted from the Hebrew word for stacte, one of the spices used in the Temple (Exodus 30:34).

== History ==
According to Walid Khalidi, Nataf was founded in 1982 on land that had previously belonged to the depopulated Palestinian village of Bayt Thul before the 1948 Arab-Israeli War, and was less than 1 km south of the village site of Nitaf. The village website states that Nataf was built on land bought from Arabs. According to Davar, 40 Israeli families bought the land from Abu Ghosh Arabs.

== Religious outlook ==
20% of the residents are Modern Orthodox; 80% of the residents are secular. The village has an unaffiliated synagogue with three sections for prayer: a men's section, a women's section and a mixed section.

== Geography ==
Nataf is situated on a ridge bounded by Kefira Valley to the north and Hamisha Valley to the south; the elevation is around 500 m above MSL. It lies at the end of a 5-kilometer road that passes through Abu Ghosh.

Nataf spring, overlooking the Kefira Valley, is a popular hiking destination. The spring flows year-round but with little water during the dry summer. The water flows from a cave via a channel to a pear-shaped cistern (5X5 meters), from which it is impossible to exit. Entering the cistern is dangerous and many hikers have had to be rescued in a state of exhaustion and hypothermia.

== Notable residents ==
- Avram Burg (b. 1955), politician, author and businessman
- Bradley Burston, retired journalist
- Ehud Shapiro (b. 1955), multi-disciplinary scientist, artist and entrepreneur
