= Simone Bitton =

French-Moroccan documentary filmmaker

- סימון ביטון
- Born: 1955 (age 70–71); Morocco
- Occupations: Director, Producer, Writer

Simone Bitton (Hebrew: סימון ביטון; born January 3, 1955) is a French-Moroccan documentary filmmaker. Her films have been nominated for or won the César Award, the Marseille Festival of Documentary Film Award, and the Sundance Film Festival, Special Jury Prize (for Mur).

== Personal life ==
Bitton was born the daughter of a Jewish jeweller in Rabat, Morocco. In 1966 she immigrated to Israel with her family and served in the IDF during the Yom Kippur War. She describes herself as a Mizrahi Jew. After settling in France, where she now mainly lives she graduated from the Institut des hautes études cinématographiques in 1981.

In December 2023, alongside 50 other filmmakers, Bitton signed an open letter published in Libération demanding a ceasefire and an end to the killing of civilians amid the 2023 Israeli invasion of the Gaza Strip, and for a humanitarian corridor into Gaza to be established for humanitarian aid, and the release of hostages.

== Filmography ==
- 1981: Solange Giraud, née Tache
- 1990: Great Voices of Arab Song
- 1992: Palestine: Story of a Land
- 1996: Umm Kulthum
- 1997: Palestine/israel, histoire d’une terre
- 1998: Ben Barka, l'équation marocaine
- 1998: Mahmoud Darwich
- 1999: Pigu'a / The Bombing
- 2000: L'Attentat
- 2001: Citizen Bishara
- 2004: Wall (Mur)
- 2009: Rachel
