= Bradley Burston =

Israeli journalist

Bradley Burston (Hebrew: בראדלי בורסטון) is an American-born Israeli journalist. Until April 2019, Burston was an English-language columnist for Haaretz and senior editor of the English-language website Haaretz.com, where he wrote a blog in English called "A Special Place in Hell". On 22 April 2019 he retired, returning with opinion pieces only on special occasions.

== Biography ==
Burston was born and raised in Los Angeles and was a member of the Labor Zionist youth movement Habonim. He graduated from University of California, Berkeley. In 1976, Burston immigrated to Israel and helped re-establish Kibbutz Gezer. He served as a combat medic in the Israel Defense Forces. He studied medicine in Beersheba for two years before becoming a journalist. He is married and has two children. He is a resident of Nataf.

== Journalism career ==
During the first Intifada, Burston served as Gaza correspondent for The Jerusalem Post. He was the Post's military correspondent during the Gulf War. Burston worked for Reuters in the 1990s, reporting on the Arab–Israeli peace process and Israeli politics. In 2000, he began working for Haaretz. On April 22, 2019, he announced his retirement in a farewell column.

== Views and opinions ==
In a Haaretz op-ed, "What does 'Death to Israel' mean to you?", Burston is critical of "progressives" who claim to support the inalienable rights of human beings over nationalism, but fail to see Israelis as people.

In 2011, Burston drew issue with "the idea that formally Muslim states are acceptable, where a Jewish state is not."

In 2015, however, Burston wrote that Israeli policy now amounts to apartheid, stating: "I used to be one of those people who took issue with the label of apartheid as applied to Israel... Not anymore... Our Israel is what it has become: Apartheid."

In December 2023, Burston wrote that Israel's Prime Minister Benjamin Netanyahu is responsible for the Hamas attack on October 7, 2023, and the ensuing Israel-Hamas war.

== Awards and recognition ==
In 2006, Search for Common Ground gave Burston its Eliav-Sartawi Award for Middle East Journalism.
