= Bayt Thul =

Bayt Thul بيت ثول
- Etymology: The house of Tul (meaning length)
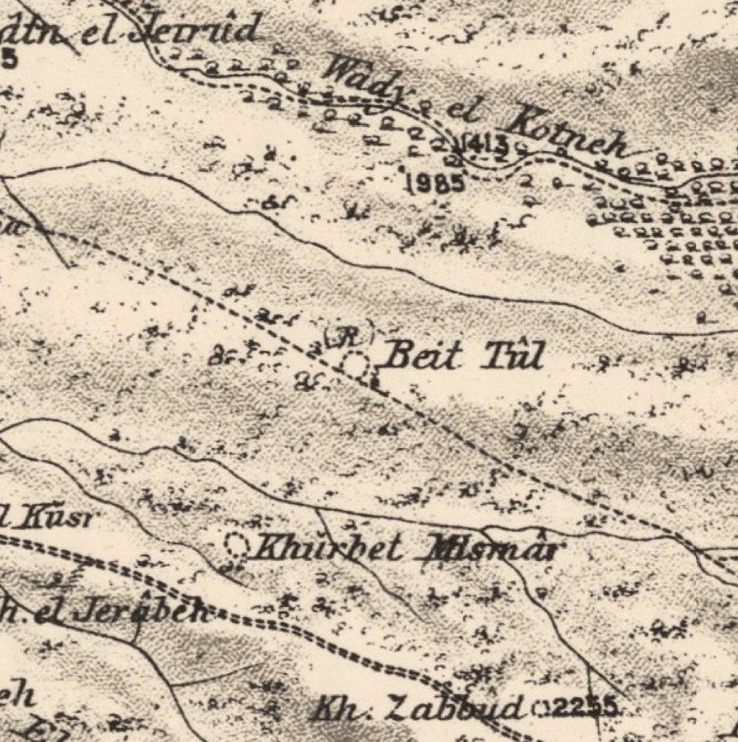
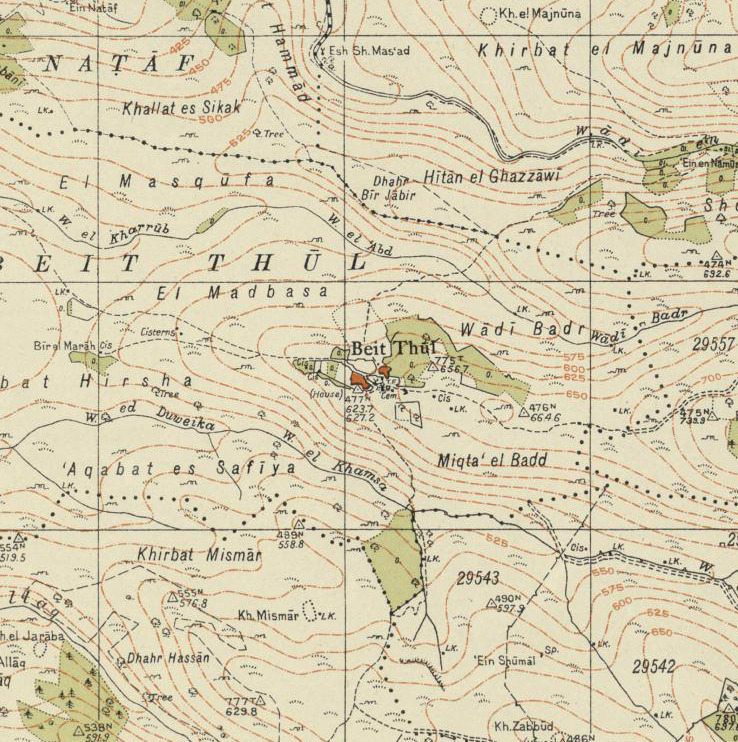
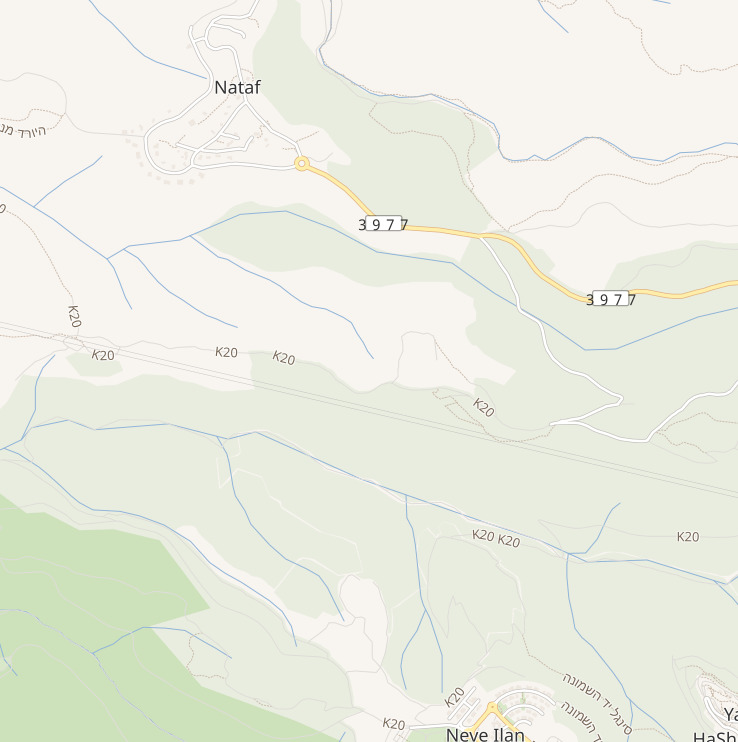
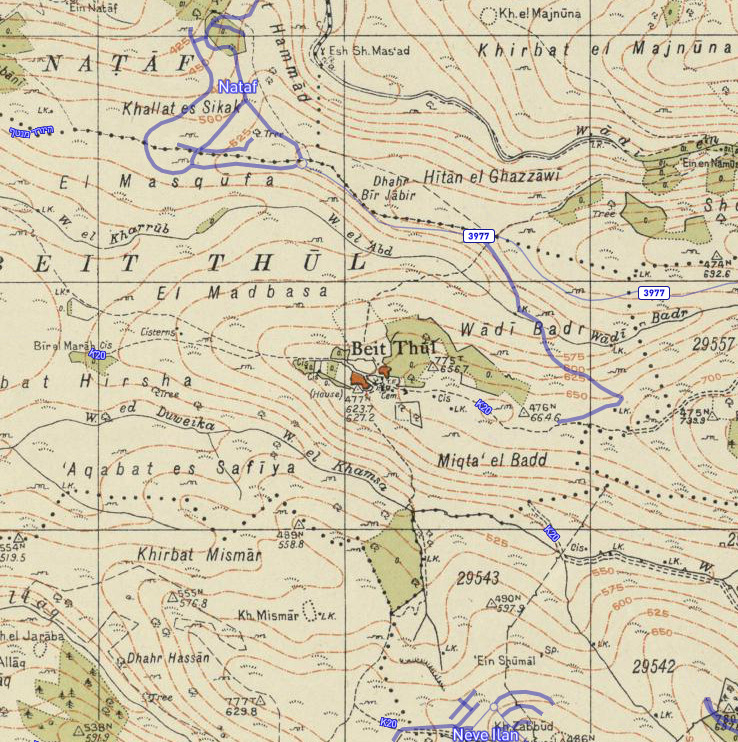
- 1870s map 1940s map modern map 1940s with modern overlay map A series of historical maps of the area around Bayt Thul (click the buttons)

- Location within Mandatory Palestine
- Coordinates: 31°49′21″N 35°04′26″E
- Palestine grid: 157/136
- Geopolitical entity: Mandatory Palestine
- Subdistrict: Jerusalem
- Date of depopulation: Not known April 1, 1948

Area
  - Total: 4,629 dunams (4.629 km^{2}; 1.787 sq mi)

Population (1945)
  - Total: 260
- Current Localities: Nataf, Neve Ilan

Bayt Thul was a Palestinian village in the Jerusalem Subdistrict. It was depopulated during the 1947–1948 Civil War in Mandatory Palestine on April 1, 1948, under Operation Nachshon. It was located 15.5 km west of Jerusalem.

== Name ==
In 1874, Clermont-Ganneau noted the similarity between the name "Beit Thul" and the Bethulia mentioned in the Book of Judith. He added that according to local fellahin, the town was previously recognized by Christians as Qal'at Fertin, signifying "the fortress of Fertin". It was named after a Christian or pagan king who once ruled the area and held dominion over the entire vicinity before meeting his demise in a catastrophic "deluge" emanating from the Tannur of Abu Shusheh, submerging the entire region.

== History ==
=== Ottoman era ===
Bayt Thul, like the rest of Palestine, was incorporated into the Ottoman Empire in 1517, and in the census of 1538–1539, Bayt Tul was noted in the Nahiya of Quds of the Liwa of Quds. In the 1596 census, the village had a population was 7 households, all Muslim. The villagers paid a fixed tax rate of 33,3% on various agricultural products, such as wheat, barley, olive trees, in addition to "occasional revenues"; a total of 1,860 akçe.

In 1838, it was noted as a Muslim village in the district of Beni Malik, west of Jerusalem.

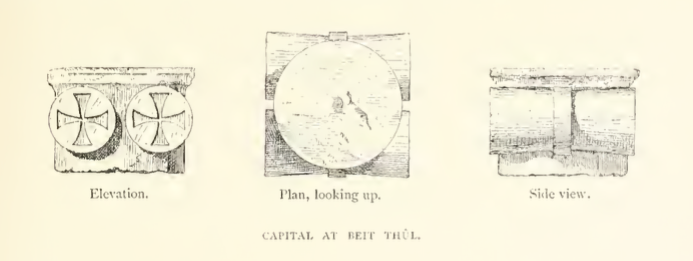
A Capital, which Clermont-Ganneau noted in Beit Thul in the 1870s

In the early 1870s Clermont-Ganneau found the village inhabited, and a "hearty welcome was accorded to us." He further noted that the "village contains two welys, one the sanctuary of Sheikh Injeim, the other that of Bedriyeh. In front of the wely of Bedriyeh, I noticed the remains of a small aqueduct of masonry and two large shafts of ancient columns." According to local tradition, Bedriyeh was the sister of Sheikh Injeim.

He found remains there which led him to conclude that an important Christian building of the Byzantine period once existed there.

In 1883, the PEF's Survey of Western Palestine noted "Foundations and a Mukam."

=== British Mandate era ===
In the 1922 census of Palestine, conducted by the British Mandate authorities, there were 133 villagers, all Muslims, increasing in the 1931 census to 182 inhabitants, in 43 inhabited houses.

In the 1945 statistics, the village had a population of 260 Muslims, with a total of 4,629 dunums of land. Of this, 55 dunams were for irrigable land or plantations, 787 for cereals, while 13 dunams were built-up, urban, land.

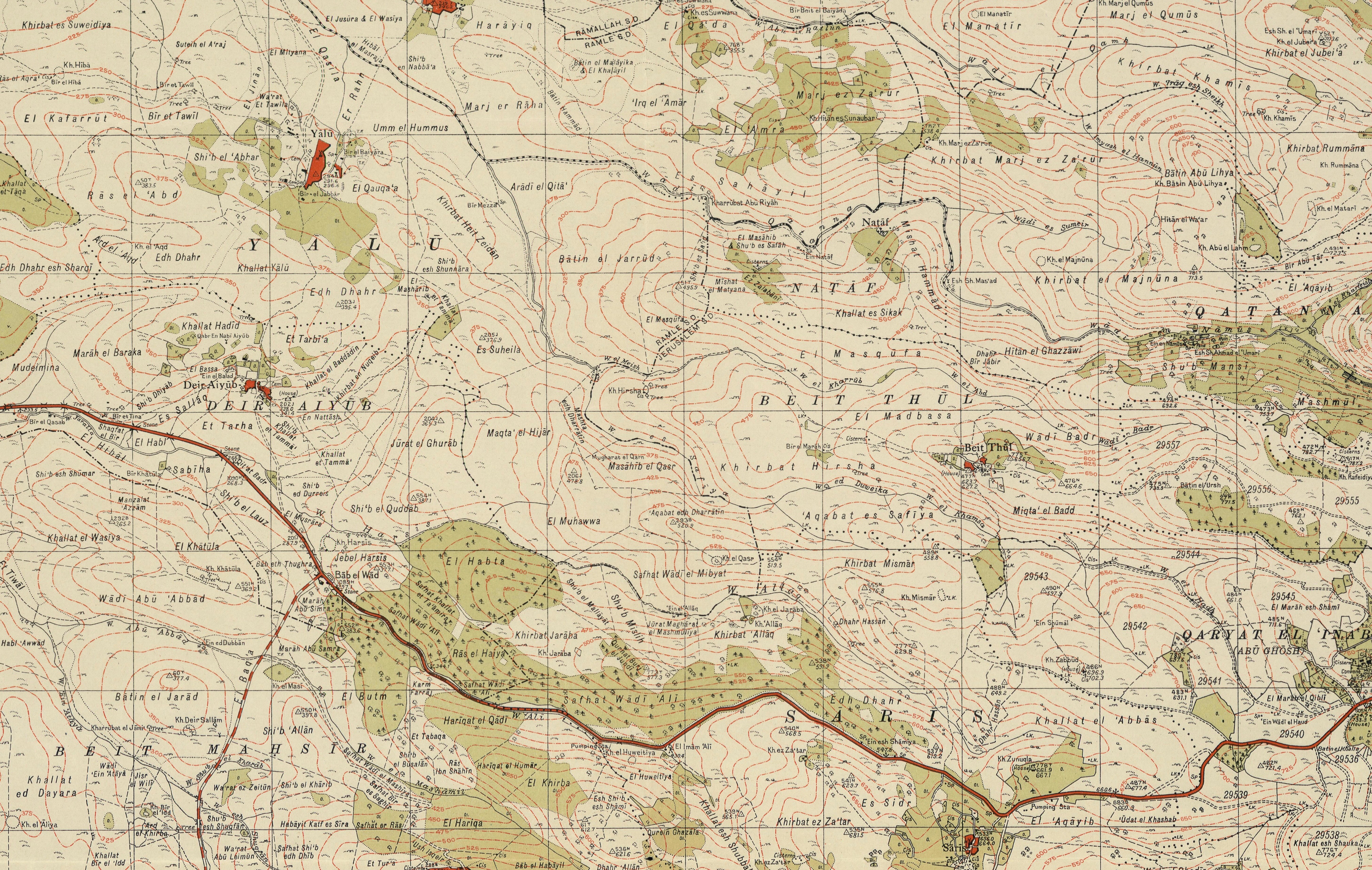
Bayt Thul 1943 1:20,000 (right of centre)

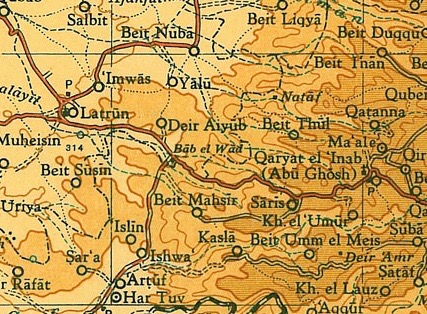
Bayt Thul 1945 1:250,000

=== 1948, aftermath ===
In late October, 1948, the Beit Horon Battalion started the destruction of Bayt Thul.

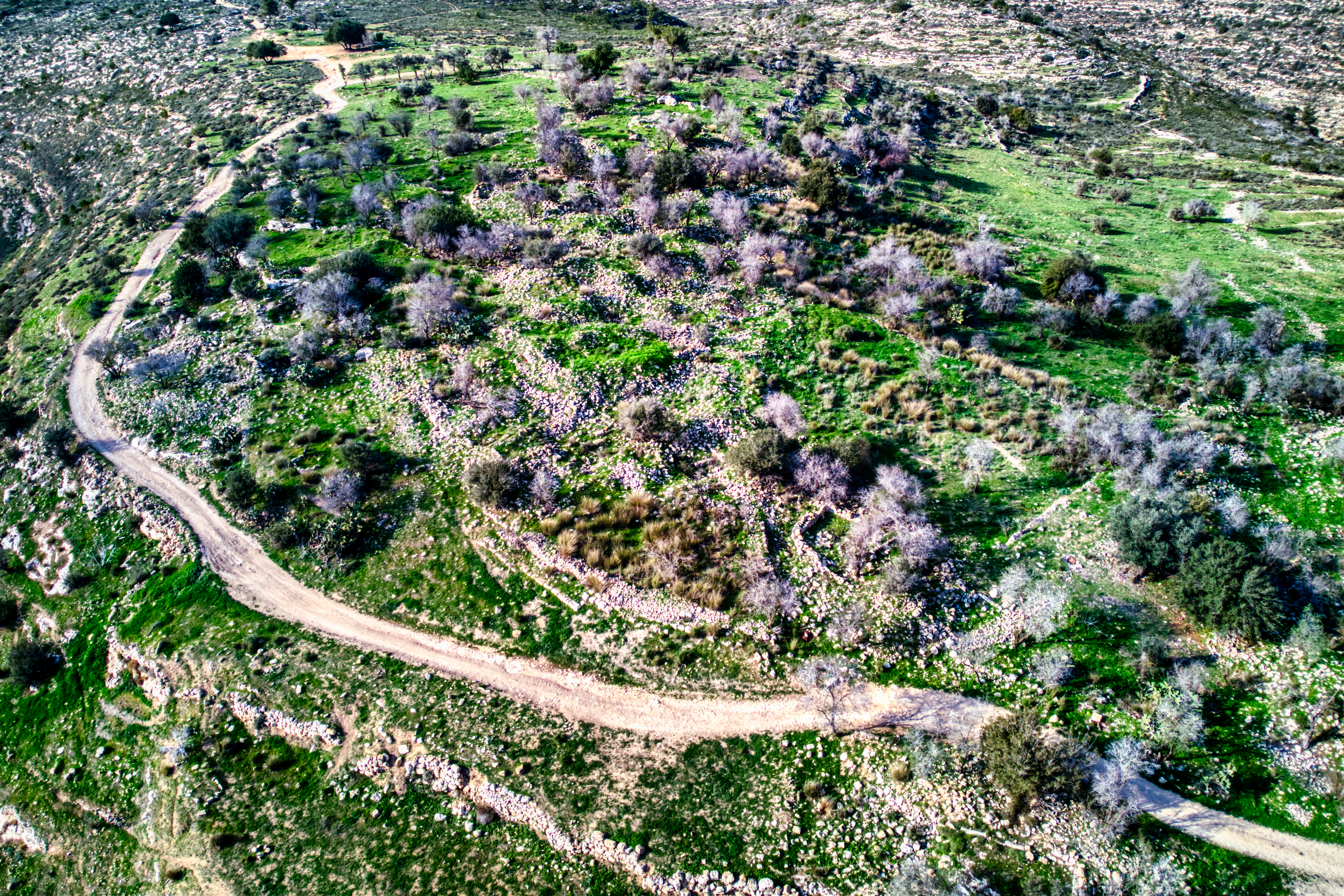
Bayt Thul remains on the Western hill

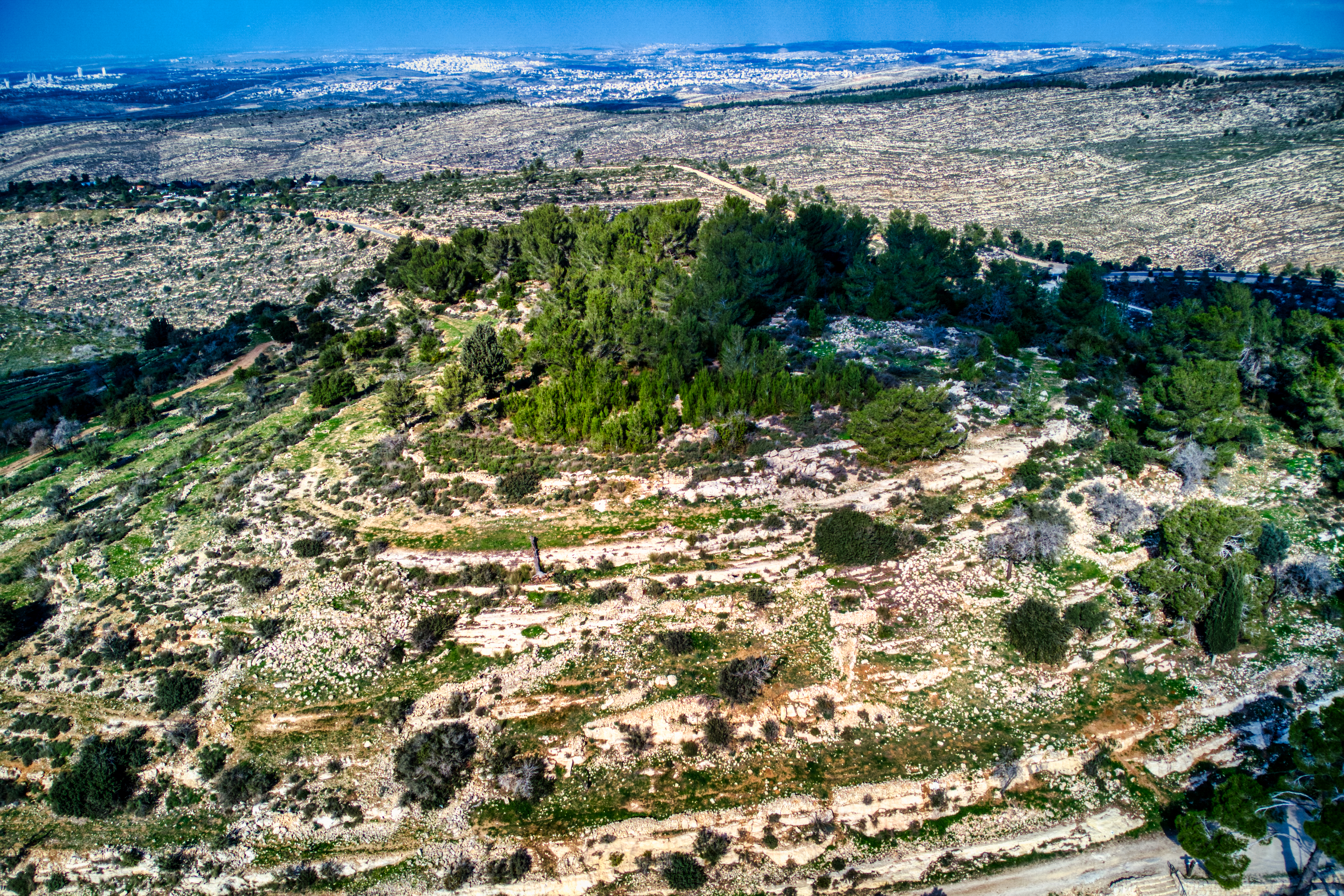
Bayt Thul remains on the Eastern hill

When the writers of an oral Palestinian history collection returned with a villager to Bayt Thul, they recorded how she, Umm 'Ali, began to collect herbs and plants. “She continued picking the leaves until what she had clutched to her chest sprouted from her like a large bush. That was Umm 'Ali, or maybe thats what we remember: A tree of wild herbs and greens moving with amazing grace over the stones of the destroyed villages, assuring, comforting, and reminding us of our descendants who are awaiting us.“

== Bibliography ==
- Barron, J. B., ed. (1923). Palestine: Report and General Abstracts of the Census of 1922. Government of Palestine.
- Clermont-Ganneau, C.S. (1896). [ARP] Archaeological Researches in Palestine 1873-1874, translated from the French by J. McFarlane. Vol. 2. London: Palestine Exploration Fund.
- Conder, C.R.; Kitchener, H. H. (1883). The Survey of Western Palestine: Memoirs of the Topography, Orography, Hydrography, and Archaeology. Vol. 3. London: Committee of the Palestine Exploration Fund.
- Davis, Rochelle A. (2011). Palestinian Village Histories: Geographies of the Displaced. Stanford University Press, Stanford, California. ISBN 978-0-8047-7312-6.
- Department of Statistics (1945). Village Statistics, April, 1945. Government of Palestine.
- Diab, Imtiaz; Fahoum, Ziyad (1990). Hikayat qarya: Qura Filastin al-mudammara 'am 1948 fi mintaqat al-Quds [Story of a village: Destroyed Palestinian villages in 1948 in the Jerusalem area]. Beirut, Lebanon: al-Mu'assasa al-'Arabiyya lil-Dirasat wa al-Nashr.
- Esber, R.M. (2008). Under the Cover of War, The Zionist Expulsions of the Palestinians. Arabicus Books & Media. ISBN 978-0981513171.
- Hadawi, S. (1970). Village Statistics of 1945: A Classification of Land and Area ownership in Palestine. Palestine Liberation Organization Research Center.
- Hütteroth, W.-D.; Abdulfattah, K. (1977). Historical Geography of Palestine, Transjordan and Southern Syria in the Late 16th Century. Erlanger Geographische Arbeiten, Sonderband 5. Erlangen, Germany: Vorstand der Fränkischen Geographischen Gesellschaft. ISBN 3-920405-41-2.
- Khalidi, W. (1992). All That Remains: The Palestinian Villages Occupied and Depopulated by Israel in 1948. Washington D.C.: Institute for Palestine Studies. ISBN 0-88728-224-5.
- Mills, E., ed. (1932). Census of Palestine 1931. Population of Villages, Towns and Administrative Areas. Jerusalem: Government of Palestine.
- Morris, B. (2004). The Birth of the Palestinian Refugee Problem Revisited. Cambridge University Press. ISBN 978-0-521-00967-6.
- Palmer, E. H. (1881). The Survey of Western Palestine: Arabic and English Name Lists Collected During the Survey by Lieutenants Conder and Kitchener, R. E. Transliterated and Explained by E.H. Palmer. Committee of the Palestine Exploration Fund.
- Robinson, E.; Smith, E. (1841). Biblical Researches in Palestine, Mount Sinai and Arabia Petraea: A Journal of Travels in the year 1838. Vol. 3. Boston: Crocker & Brewster.
- Toledano, E. (1984). "The Sanjaq of Jerusalem in the Sixteenth Century: Aspects of Topography and Population". Archivum Ottomanicum. 9: 279–319. Archived from the original on 2016-03-05.
