= Mike Stout =

- Origin: Pittsburgh, USA
- Genres: rock, protest, indie
- Labels: American Blue Collar Records

Mike Stout is an American labor supporter, social activist and rock guitar player and protest singer, who lives in Pittsburgh, United States. He is also known as the "World's Grievance Man."

== Music and activism ==
Stout was born in Kentucky, and began his musical career in New York City in 1968 playing his protest songs at Cafe Wha?, The Bitter End, and The Gaslight Cafe coffee house where Bob Dylan also played.

In 1977 Stout became a steelworker at Homestead Works, where he was elected the union's head grievance man. He used his music to rally his co-workers at union meetings, where "they fought to win more than $10 million in lost wages, severance pay, pensions, and unemployment benefits for 3,000 displaced works... with thousands of families losing unemployment benefits and facing foreclosure." Stout organized a benefit concert that drew attention from CBS, NBC, the AP, UPI and the international press to raise funds, which later led to the formation of the Greater Pittsburgh Community Food bank.

After the mill closings, Stout started writing songs again. He has recorded nine CDs in the last ten years and performed across the United States and Europe with "the message of human solidarity and peace." A Duquesne University professor took one of his CDs to the People to People book store in Germany and his songs. People to People, impressed with his message, began stocking his CDs and sponsored his four concert tours in Germany and Poland. Stout claims to have sold "thousands of CDs" in Europe.

=== Influence ===
Mike Stout describes himself as "a socially conscious singer song-writer and community leader" who "leads crusades against local and global economic injustice, rallying people with his music, and he organizes them to take action." He tells "his stories from the heart about people who are affected by unemployment, or social injustice or war." He states his tunes and lyrics are influenced by artists like Woody Guthrie, Pete Seeger, Bob Dylan, Bruce Springsteen, and Neil Young, whom he calls "musical heroes".

John Hayes of the Pittsburgh Post-Gazette wrote:

"In the Woody Guthrie tradition, his songs reflect contemporary issues without resorting to journalism. They're more like partisan op-ed columns that grab political opponents by the throat and don't let go."

=== Organizations and causes Stout Supports ===
Stout supports various organizations and causes including, Depleted Uranium Watch, Campaign Against Depleted Uranium, Thomas Merton Center. He is a founding board member of the Just Harvest and Steel Valley Authority organizations which "aid displaced workers and the poor."

== See also ==
- Greenwich Village#Since the 1960s
