= Morag Corridor =

Israeli security corridor in southern Gaza

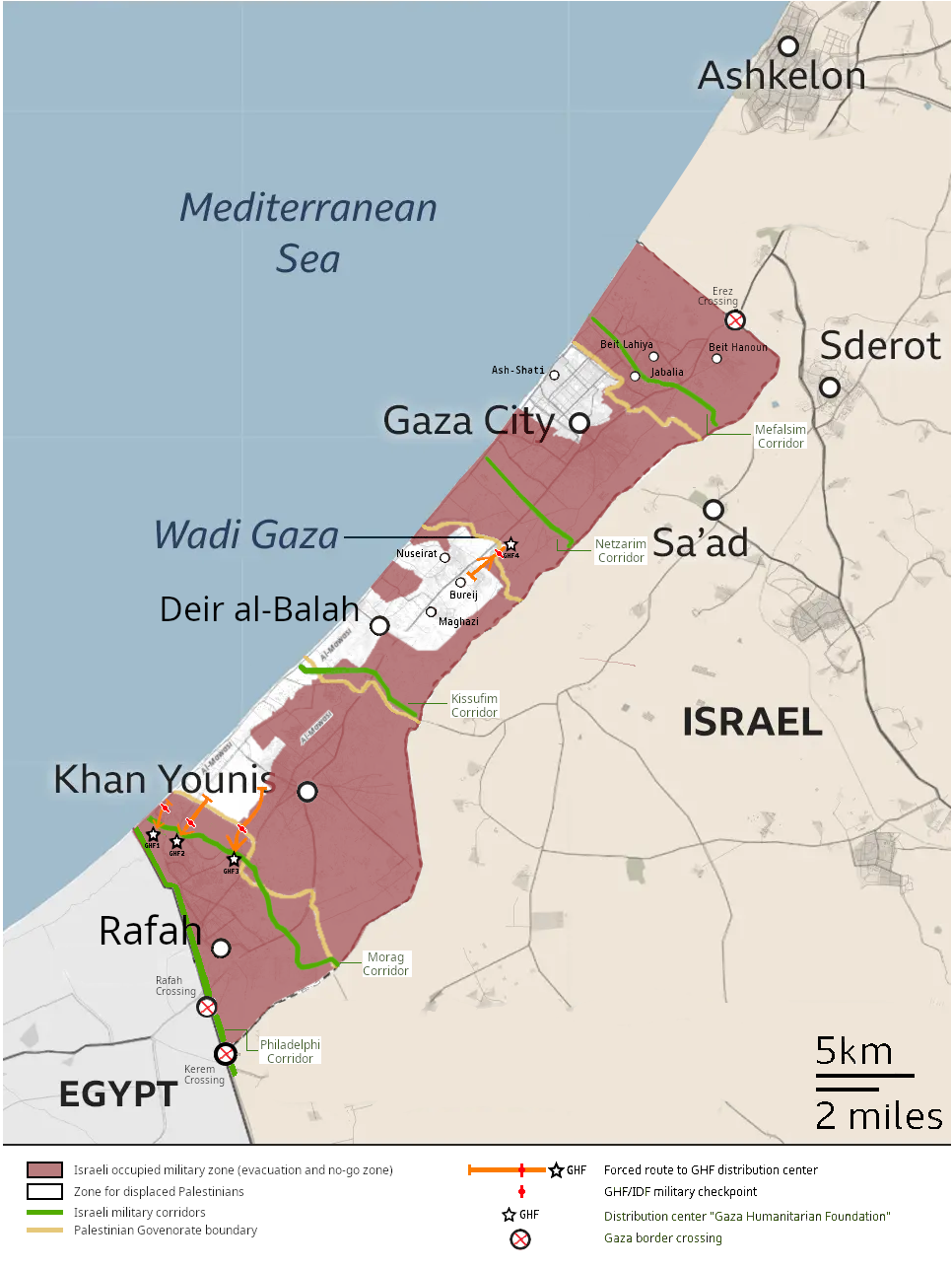
- Map of Israeli military corridors in Gaza, including the Morag Corridor. The Morag Corridor separates the Gaza Strip between Khan Yunis and Rafah, stretching northwest from Israel to the Mediterranean Sea
- Interactive map of Morag Corridor
- Coordinates: 31°18′30″N 34°17′17″E
- Region: Gaza Strip
- Fully captured: 12 April 2025

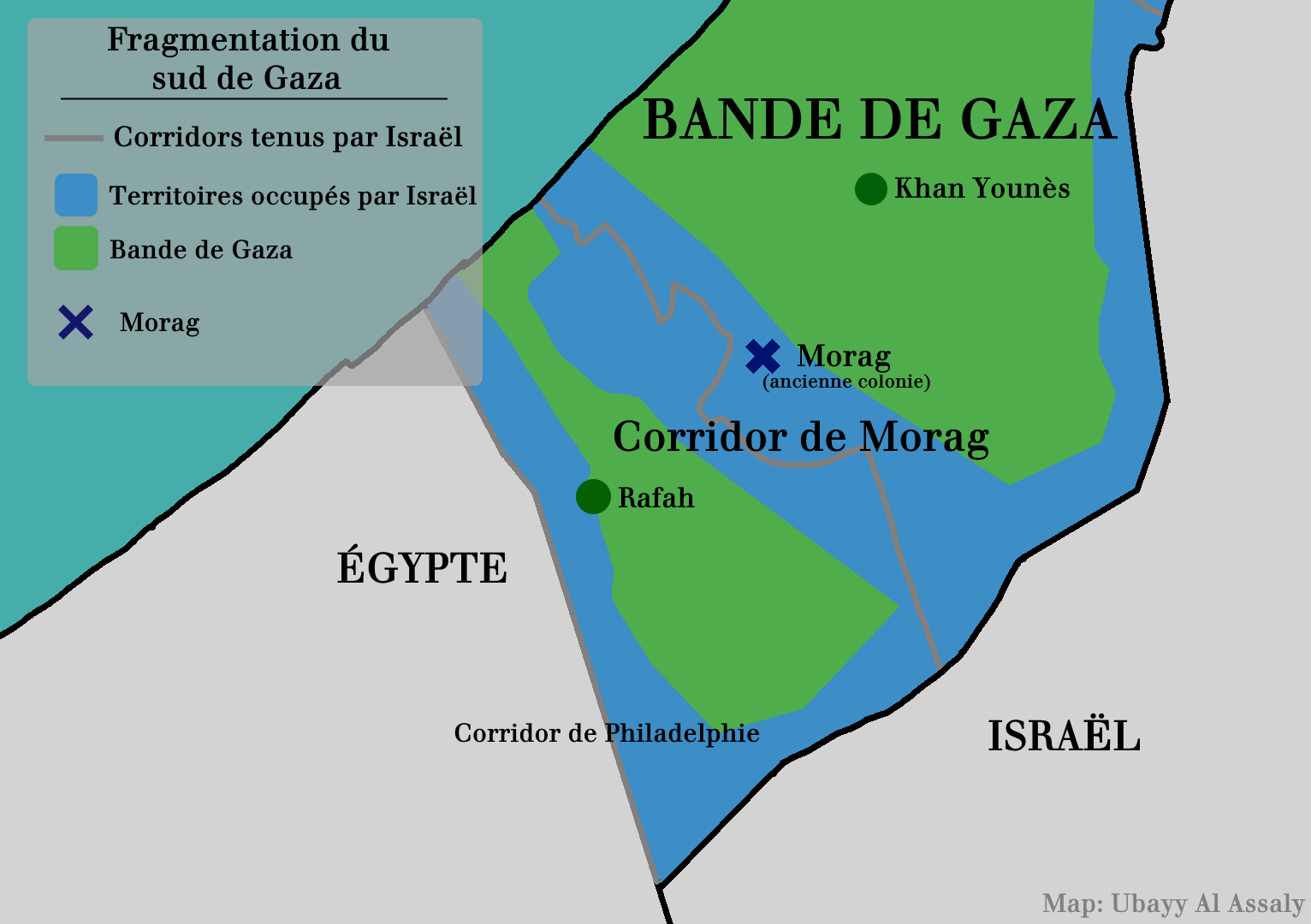

Map of the Gaza war

The Morag Corridor is an Israeli security corridor in the southern Gaza Strip announced by Prime Minister of Israel Benjamin Netanyahu on 2 April 2025 during a renewed offensive against Rafah, and fully established on 12 April 2025. The security zone, named after a former Jewish settlement that once existed between Rafah and Khan Yunis, would create a third Israeli-controlled axis dividing sections of Gaza. Netanyahu described this measure as intended to increase pressure on Hamas to release remaining hostages and surrender control of the territory.

== History ==
The Morag Corridor's establishment was first announced by Prime Minister of Israel Benjamin Netanyahu on 2 April 2025, following the resumption of Israeli attacks on the Gaza Strip after the breakdown of the ceasefire implemented in January 2025. The corridor was named after Morag, an Israeli settlement in Gush Katif prior to its 2005 disestablishment. He stated that the Israel Defense Forces (IDF) were "switching gears" in Gaza, with the Morag Corridor being part of plans to seize more territory and establish new security corridors. The corridors would effectively partition Gaza into separate sections with restricted travel between them.

The corridor, upon completion, would join two existing Israeli-controlled security zones in Gaza: the Philadelphi Corridor along Gaza's southern border with Egypt under Israeli control since May 2024, and the Netzarim Corridor separating northern Gaza and Gaza City from the rest of the territory. Netanyahu described the Morag Corridor as "the second Philadelphi, an additional Philadelphi Corridor".

The third corridor would effectively separate Rafah, Gaza's southernmost city, from the central parts of the Gaza Strip. According to Netanyahu's statement, this strategic division aims to "cut up the strip" and intensify pressure on Hamas until they release all remaining Israeli hostages, disarm, and leave Gaza. In his announcement, he directly connected the establishment of the corridor to hostage negotiations, stating it was intended to increase leverage against Hamas.

Defense Minister Israel Katz further indicated that Israel intended to seize "large areas" to incorporate into these security zones. He separately demanded that residents of Gaza "expel Hamas and return all the hostages," describing this as "the only way to end the war."

On 12 April, the Israeli Defense Forces announced the full takeover of the corridor by the Golani Infantry Brigade and the 36th Division’s 188th Armored Brigade, and ordered the complete evacuation of several neighborhoods in Rafah to al-Mawasi. Engineering teams began building a road extending through the corridor. Defense Minister Israel Katz stated that the corridor's establishment resulted in Rafah becoming an “Israeli security zone”, establishing a southern buffer zone extending from the Philadelphi Corridor to Khan Yunis and covering roughly 20% of the Gaza Strip.

== Responses ==
Former Coordinator of Government Activities in the Territories (COGAT) Eitan Dangot suggested the Morag Corridor's seizure could represent the beginning of a division of Gaza into three sections for Israeli control. He characterized the approach as enabling "closed control" by IDF forces, preventing movement between areas and allowing Israel to maintain "full control of traffic that will be allowed to enter and to cross," including humanitarian aid. He further characterized the corridor as a possible "political decision" meant to show right-wing extremist government members that Israel would re-establish its presence in settlements that had been dismantled.

Former Head of the Civil Department for the COGAT Colonel Grisha Yakubovich posited that the IDF might intend extend a buffer zone in southern Gaza while evacuating the population of Rafah, with the stated goal of protecting nearby Israeli communities.

The Palestinian Authority, Hamas's political rival which governs the West Bank, expressed "complete rejection" towards the corridor, while also calling for Hamas to relinquish power in Gaza.

Hamas has maintained that it would only release the remaining hostages in exchange for a comprehensive agreement including the release of Palestinian prisoners, a permanent ceasefire, and a complete Israeli withdrawal from Gaza. Hamas rejected demands to disarm or leave the territory.

== See also ==
- Netzarim Corridor
- Philadelphi Corridor
- Egypt–Gaza barrier
- Gaza–Israel barrier
