= Kerem Shalom aid convoy looting =

2024 looting incident in the Gaza Strip

- Part of the Gaza war, Gaza humanitarian crisis, and the Popular Forces–Hamas conflict
- Kerem Shalom (the Gaza Strip) Location within the Gaza Strip
- Date: 16 November 2024
- Location: Kerem Shalom border crossing, Gaza Strip
- Perpetrators: Popular Forces; Israel Defense Forces (indirectly, alleged)
- Outcome: 98 out of 109 UN aid trucks looted

On 16 November 2024, the Popular Forces, an Israeli-backed militia/gang accused of links with the Islamic State, raided a convoy of 109 United Nations aid trucks and looted 98 of them, near Israeli military installations at the Kerem Shalom border crossing in the Gaza Strip. The perpetrators, who according to a UN memo may have had "protection" from the Israel Defense Forces, threw grenades and held truck drivers at gunpoint, forcing them to unload their aid. The incident further exacerbated the Gaza humanitarian crisis caused by the Gaza war. The incident has been described by the UNRWA as "one of the worst" incidents of its kind.

== Background ==
The Gaza war and Israeli blockade of the Gaza Strip has resulted in a humanitarian crisis in the Gaza Strip. In early November 2024, a UN-backed panel warned that all of Gaza faced a risk of imminent famine between November 2024 and April 2025, with the north at most risk. The Israeli blockade severely restricted the entry of aid trucks into the Gaza Strip. Israeli targeting of civilian police officers who were responsible for guarding humanitarian convoys caused civil order to start collapsing by February 2024. This led to a rise in civilians and criminals raiding trucks and stealing supplies from the UN, slowing aid deliveries to the Gaza Strip. The Israeli seizure and closure of the Rafah border crossing with Egypt in May 2024, following the Rafah offensive, significantly reduced the number of aid trucks entering Gaza and shifted most of the humanitarian traffic to the Israeli-controlled Kerem Shalom border crossing. Defense officials confirmed that the IDF is aware of aid convoy lootings, and at one point the Israeli government considered handing responsibility over distributing aid to local clans that played a role in looting convoys, even if some of them were involved in terrorism and affiliated with the Islamic State.

The United Nations and international humanitarian aid organizations reported losing $25.5 million worth of humanitarian goods to looting over the summer.

== Incident ==
The raid took place during the night of 16 November 2024 near the heavily fortified Israeli-controlled Karem Shalom border crossing in the Gaza Strip. The aid convoy was scheduled to enter Gaza on 17 November, although the IDF instructed it to "depart at short notice via an unfamiliar route" on 16 November, giving the drivers 30 minutes to leave.

The convoy was ambushed by gunmen during the night. The attackers shot the tires of trucks to halt and loot them. They also threw grenades and held truck drivers at gunpoint, some of whom were reportedly shot, forcing them to unload their aid. In previous incidents, gangs have also killed, beaten and kidnapped the drivers and damaged their trucks. The UNRWA reported that looters shot at the trucks and detained a driver for hours, in addition to causing "injuries to transporters" and "extensive vehicle damage". The incident sparked confusion among local Palestinians, who expressed confusion over the fact that several armed men went undetected in a highly surveilled area.

According to UNRWA spokeswoman, Louise Wateridge, only 11 out of 109 aid trucks made it to their destination in Gaza. She also reported that Israeli authorities "continue to restrict a huge amount of the humanitarian response" to Gaza. The UNRWA has yet to hear of the number of casualties and the types of injuries the truck drivers endured.

=== Perpetrators ===
The UNRWA stated that it was unable to identify the perpetrators due to the "total breakdown of civil order". According to an internal memo from the United Nations, the gangs in the Gaza Strip "may be benefiting from a passive if not active benevolence" or "protection" from the Israel Defense Forces. The UN also reported that a gang leader had established a "military-like compound" in an area that was "restricted, controlled and patrolled by the IDF". An eyewitness reported seeing a gangster armed with an AK-47 just 100 meters from an Israeli Merkava tank. The gangs have run cigarette-smuggling operations, and have been described as rivals of Hamas.

United Nations humanitarian coordinator for the occupied Palestinian territories, Muhannad Hadi, reported that Gaza is essentially lawless and that Israel is "the occupying power", and therefore the incident "is on them" for failing to ensure the area's protection and security.

Contrary to Israeli claims that Hamas is stealing aid, a United States official stated that Hamas is not responsible for the attacks. An international aid official reported that there is no evidence of "physical interference from Hamas" anywhere in the north or south of Gaza.

== Aftermath ==
Following the incident, Gaza's interior ministry said that Hamas, in cooperation with tribal committees, expanded its operations targeting "gangs" accused of looting trucks bringing aid into Gaza. They said that 20 people were killed who had been involved in the aid convoy looting near the Kerem Shalom border crossing. Hamas stated that anyone caught engaging in a similar looting will be dealt with "an iron fist".

== Reactions ==
- (United Nations) UNRWA commissioner general Philippe Lazzarini confirmed the looting and stated that "we have been warning a long time ago about the total breakdown of civil order" in Gaza. The UNRWA blamed the "collapse of law and order" caused by the "approach of the Israeli authorities" for the incident.
- United States State Department Spokesperson Matthew Miller called the looting "abhorrent" and blamed it for the "overall breakdown" of security in Gaza, for which he said "the IDF certainly bears part of the blame for".
- The Palestinian National and Islamic Forces condemned the looting by "criminal thieves who disrupt the security of our internal front and steal the livelihoods, bread and medicine of our citizens".

== See also ==
- Gaza Strip famine
- Israeli direct action against aid delivery to Gaza
- Societal breakdown in the Gaza Strip during the Gaza war
