= Philadelphi Corridor =

Strip of land on the Egypt–Gaza border

- The Philadelphi Route separates Egyptian Sinai from the Gaza Strip, stretching north-northwest from Kerem Shalom to the Mediterranean Sea
- Interactive map of Philadelphi Corridor
- Region: Gaza Strip, Palestine

The Philadelphi Corridor, also called Philadelphi Route (Hebrew: ציר פילדלפי, romanized: Tzir Pildalfi) is the Israeli code name for a narrow strip of land, some 100 metres wide and 14 km (8.7 miles) long, situated along the entirety of the border between the Gaza Strip and Egypt. The corridor is also called as the Salah al-Din Axis (Arabic: محور صلاح الدين) by Palestinians.

Following Israel's unilateral disengagement from the Gaza Strip in 2005, the Philadelphi Accord with Egypt was concluded, which authorized Egypt to deploy 750 border guards along the route to patrol the border on Egypt's side. The Palestinian side of the border was controlled by the Palestinian Authority until the 2007 takeover by Hamas. The joint authority for the Rafah Border Crossing was transferred to the Palestinian Authority and Egypt for restricted passage by Palestinian ID card holders, and by others by exception.

One purpose of the Philadelphi Route was to prevent the movement of illegal materials (including weapons and ammunition) and people between Egypt and the Gaza Strip.

== Background ==
The 1979 Egypt–Israel peace treaty stipulated that the Israel-Egypt border would follow the border of Mandatory Palestine. The new border divided Rafah into two towns, one Palestinian and one Egyptian, separating families on both sides of the border. Following the October 2014 Sinai attacks, Egypt destroyed the Egyptian side of the city and had demolished at least 7,460 buildings by 2020.

== Philadelphi Accord ==
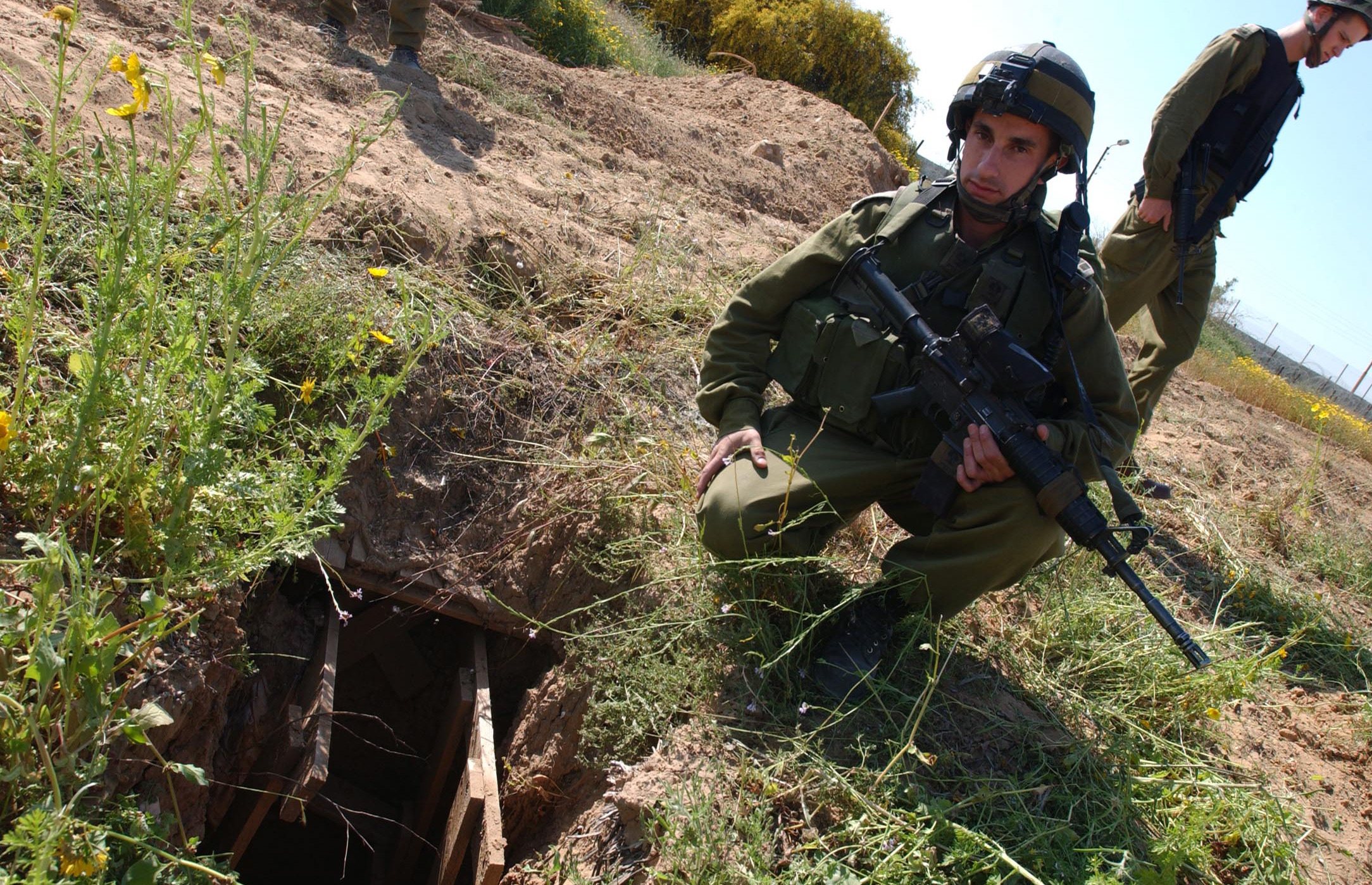
IDF soldiers uncover a tunnel near the Philadelphi Route shortly before the disengagement

In 2004, the Israeli Knesset approved a plan to unilaterally withdraw all Israeli citizens and military forces from the Gaza Strip, which went into force in August 2005. The disengagement plan defined the Philadelphi Corridor as "The border area between the Gaza Strip and Egypt". The name Philadelphi was randomly chosen for the 9 mile-long corridor by the Israeli army.

On 1 September 2005, the "Agreed Arrangements Regarding the Deployment of a Designated Force of Border Guards Along the Border in the Rafah Area", known as the Philadelphi Accord, was signed by Israel and Egypt. Under the accord, Egypt was authorized to deploy border guards along the route to patrol the border on Egypt's side. The objective was to prevent smuggling of weapons from Egypt into the Gaza Strip, infiltration and other criminal activity. Egypt would also coordinate operations and share intelligence. Rafah Crossing would be the main border crossing with Gaza. The area near the border (known as Area C) would be a demilitarized zone, with Egypt only permitted to maintain police forces there.

The Accord contains 83 clauses and specifically describes the mission and obligations of the parties, including the specific types of machinery, weaponry and infrastructure permitted.

=== Egyptian Border Guard Force ===
The Philadelphi Accord created the Egyptian Border Guard Force (BGF) composed of 750 ground personnel divided between headquarters and four companies deployed along the route to patrol the border on Egypt's side. The agreement specified that the Egyptian force is "a designated force for the combating of terrorism and infiltration across the border" and not intended for any military purposes.

The parties acknowledge that the BGF [Border Guard Force] deployment and these Agreed Arrangements, in no way constitute an amendment to or a revision or modification of Annex I to the Peace Treaty. Rather they constitute additional mission-oriented security measures agreed upon by the parties.

— Philadelphi Accord, Article 9

Instead, it "enhance[ed] Egypt's capability to fight smuggling along the border," while ensuring that the forces would not serve any military purposes. Sentry posts, watchtowers and logistical facilities were permitted. Heavy armored vehicles, fortification, military-style intelligence-gathering equipment, and weaponry and equipment beyond the below numbers were prohibited. Israel insisted on the inclusion of provisions indicating that the Accord was not an amendment to the 1979 Peace Treaty. During negotiations Egypt attempted to frame the agreement toward the re-militarization of the Sinai and its borders with Israel and Gaza.

The BGF are equipped with the following:

- 500 assault rifles
- 67 light machine guns
- 27 light anti-personnel launchers
- ground radar
- 31 police-style vehicles
- 44 logistical and auxiliary vehicles

=== Reaction ===
For strategic reasons, the Israeli defense establishment opposed vacating the Philadelphi route. A primary concern was the threat to Israeli security from militarization of Gaza. However, Israel decided to vacate the corridor in order to prevent friction which could destabilize the region further.

The decision to withdraw from the Philadelphi Route also posed a threat to the neighboring Egyptians through the potential militarization of Gaza. It was feared that Israel's departure would create a power vacuum that the weak Palestinian leadership would not be able to fill, thus creating a void to be filled by radical Islamists. A number of scholars have looked into the legal issue of whether or not the Philadelphi Accord needed to be passed by the Knesset. Generally, the Knesset approves of major treaties either before or after their passage. The issue arose because the Philadelphi Accord would partially militarize Area D of the Egypt–Israel Peace Treaty, changing the treaty and hence needing Knesset approval. This position was advocated by the Knesset's Foreign Affairs and Defense Committee Chairperson, Yuval Steinitz; he was supported by MK Danny Yatom and they jointly filed a petition to the Supreme Court against the Government. Prime Minister Ariel Sharon on the other hand, argued that the treaty did not change the "demilitarized" status of Area C, and therefore was not a significant enough treaty that it needed to be ratified. On 6 July 2005, the Attorney General ruled that the government was not bound to seek Knesset approval for the treaty, but convention stipulated that it should.

== Rafah border crossing ==
Following the disengagement from Gaza, Israel signed with the Palestinian Authority the Agreement on Movement and Access (AMA) on 15 November 2005. The Agreement allowed the opening of the Gaza-Egypt border for restricted passage of Palestinian residents, and the export of agricultural products from Gaza. The AMA also promised a link between Gaza and West Bank for buses and trucks, construction of a Gaza Seaport, discussion regarding a Gaza airport, and more freedom of movement within the West Bank. The Rafah Border Crossing was opened near Rafah on 25 November 2005, operated by the Palestinian Authority and US-sponsored Egypt, under supervision of EU observers. During the first six months of 2006, the crossing was opened nine and a half hours a day with an average of 650 people crossing daily each way, which was almost double the average prior to the AMA.

After Hamas kidnapped Gilad Shalit, the Rafah border was closed on 25 June 2006, although the incident did not happen in Rafah. Since then, the crossing was only irregularly opened for very limited cases. The border was never opened for the passage of goods. When Hamas took over the Gaza Strip in 2007, Egypt and Israel closed the borders with Gaza.

=== Hamas control of Gaza ===
In January 2008, Palestinian militants breached several parts of the wall bordering the town of Rafah. Thousands of Gazans flowed into Egypt in search of food and supplies. As of August 2012 the Egyptian Army continued to destroy tunnels linking Egypt and Gaza and their security source said their demolition will continue "in order to fight any element of terrorism."

After the fall of the Mubarak regime in 2011, Egypt relaxed restrictions at its border with the Gaza Strip, allowing more Palestinians to cross freely for the first time in four years. The Egyptian army continued to destroy Gaza Strip smuggling tunnels, according to the Egyptian army "in order to fight any element of terrorism".

As of April 2013, Egypt reinforced its troops on the border with the Gaza Strip. The Egyptian Army destroyed tunnels by flooding them.

In October 2014, Egypt announced that they planned to expand the buffer zone between Gaza and Egypt, following a terrorist attack from Gaza that killed 31 Egyptian soldiers. Between July 2013 and August 2015, Egypt demolished 3,255 private houses on their side of the Egypt-Gaza border in order to create a buffer zone. By 2020, at least 7,460 buildings had been demolished.

=== 2023–present Gaza war ===
The Rafah area was the site of active conflict in the Gaza war, including the border crossing which was at least partially closed due to military action.

On 11 December 2023, Israeli Prime Minister Benjamin Netanyahu told a Knesset Foreign Affairs and Security Committee that Israel will control the Philadelphi Corridor (border between Gaza and Egypt) and that Israel would impose a buffer zone inside the Gaza Strip.

On 16 January 2024, the Egyptian government warned that any occupation of the Philadelphi Corridor by Israeli forces would be a violation of the 1978 Camp David Accords.

On 7 May 2024, Israel took control of the Rafah crossing and stationed its forces within the Philadelphi Corridor, violating the terms of the Camp David Accords. On 15 May, Israel asked Egypt to open its border so Gazan civilians who wished to, could flee across to Egypt.

The Middle East Monitor reported diplomatic sources said that on 19 August 2024, the Israeli government had asked to cancel the Philadelphi Accord during tripartite diplomatic talks in Cairo between Israel, Egypt and the US which were attempting to reach security understandings. Egypt was reported to have categorically rejected this request.

== See also ==
- Egypt–Gaza barrier
- Morag Corridor
- Netzarim Corridor
