= Kerem Shalom border crossing =

Border crossing at the Egypt–Gaza–Israel junction point

Kerem Shalom crossing מעבר כרם שלום معبر كرم أبو سالم
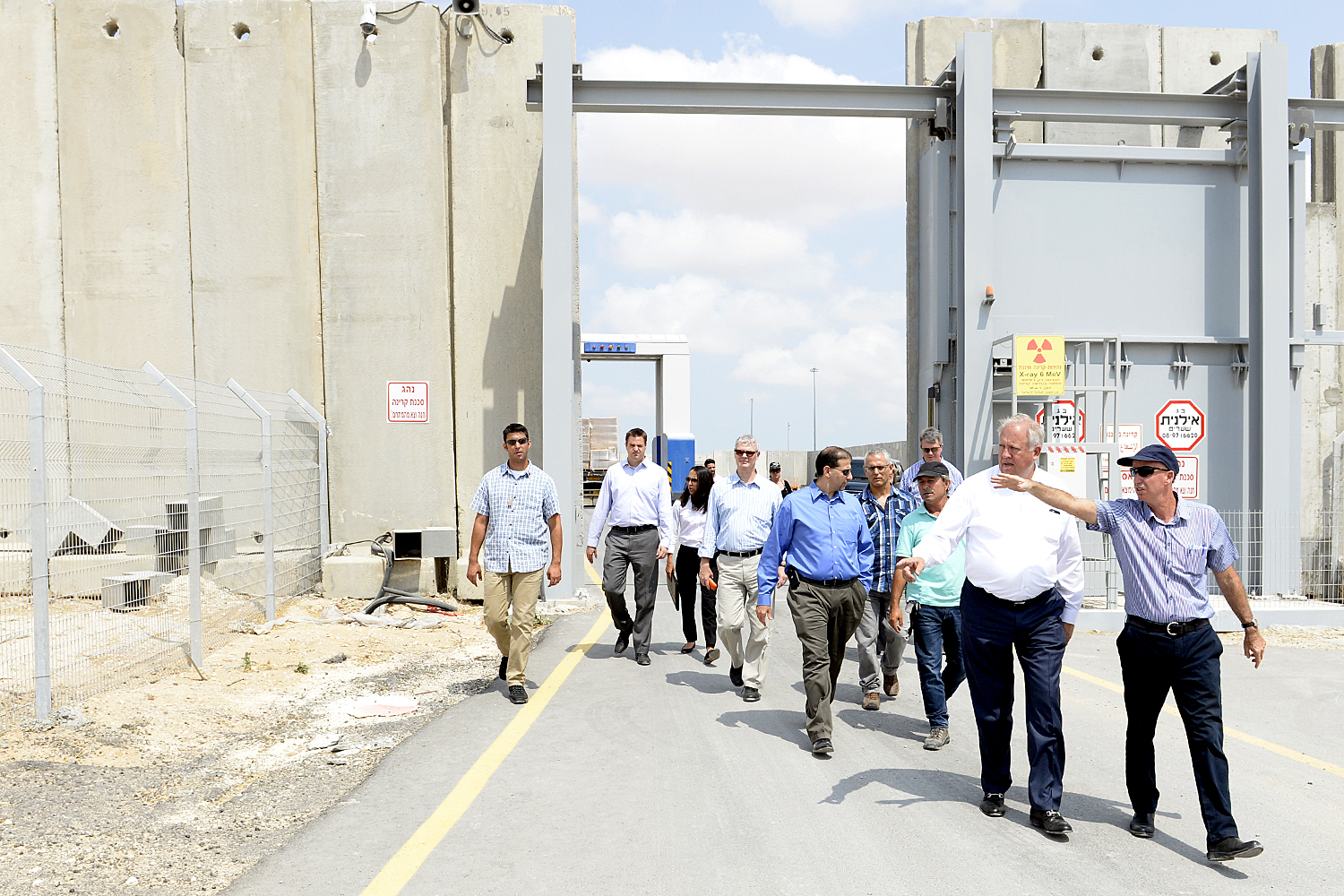
- Coordinates: 31°13′15″N 34°16′14″E
- Carries: Goods, supplies
- Crosses: Gaza–Israel barrier
- Locale: Israel; Gaza Strip

Statistics
- Daily traffic: 250 trucks/day (2012)

Location
- Interactive map of Kerem Shalom crossing

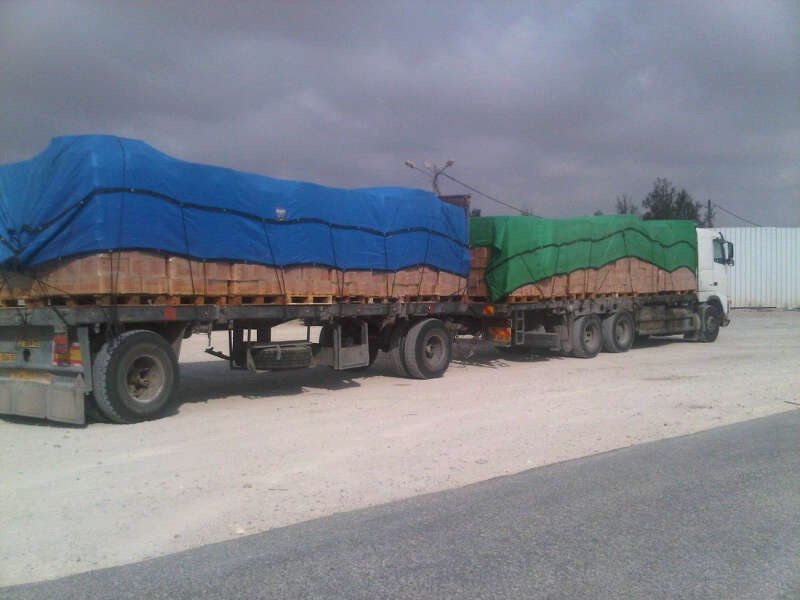
Cargo entering Gaza at Kerem Shalom crossing

Kerem Shalom border crossing (Hebrew: מעבר כרם שלום, "Vineyard of Peace"; Arabic: معبر كرم أبو سالم, Karem Abu Salem) is a border crossing at the junction of two border sections: one between the Gaza Strip and Israel, and one between the Gaza Strip and Egypt. Located just next to Kerem Shalom, an Israeli kibbutz, it is used by trucks carrying goods from Israel or Egypt to the Gaza Strip.

== Operation ==
Until 2007, European monitors from the European Union Border Assistance Mission Rafah (EUBAM Rafah) used the Kerem Shalom crossing to get to the Rafah Border Crossing. The EUBAM heads a Liaison Office at Kerem Shalom which receives real-time video and data feeds of the activities at the Rafah crossing. The Liaison Office meets regularly to review implementation of the Agreed Principles for Rafah Crossing, to resolve any dispute pertaining to the agreement, and to perform other tasks specified therein. The Liaison Office is staffed by liaison officers from EUBAM, the Palestinian Authority, and the Government of Israel.

In the early 2010s, NIS 75 million was invested in upgrading and expanding the crossing, which is capable of handling 450 trucks a day.

The Palestinian side of the crossing is operated by two families who were granted a franchise by the Palestinian Authority and authorized by Hamas. The Ministry of Commerce and Industry in Ramallah coordinates activity with Israel. The two sides are 400 meters apart, separated by a drop-off zone for unloading goods.

The Gaza Strip smuggling tunnels have been used to evade import taxes imposed by Hamas (which seized control of Gaza in 2007), as well as to smuggle in goods that Israel has banned from entering Gaza. After deposing Egyptian President Mohammed Morsi in 2013, the Egyptian military shut down many tunnels in 2014 and 2015. Israel bans the import into Gaza of weapons and dual-use goods (products that have civilian applications but may be diverted for military use), although many of these banned items are smuggled through tunnels.

The Israeli side of the crossing was at one point managed by the Israel Airports Authority, but is now managed by the Crossings Administration within the Ministry of Defense.

== History and incidents ==
=== 2006 Gilad Shalit incident ===
On 25 June 2006, Corporal Gilad Shalit was captured by Palestinian nationalist Al Qassam militants near Kerem Shalom after the attackers infiltrated the border from the Gaza Strip into Israel via a tunnel. Two Israeli Defense Force (IDF) soldiers were killed and three others wounded, in addition to Shalit. In response and with the mission of rescuing Shalit, the IDF entered the Gaza Strip as part of Operation Summer Rains on 28 June. Shalit was freed in a prisoner exchange on 18 October 2011.

=== 2008 Al Qassam attack ===
On 19 April 2008, Palestinian suicide bombers detonated their explosives-laden vehicles at the crossing. According to the IDF, two jeeps and an APC (armored personnel carrier) were used and two vehicles were detonated, killing three bombers and wounding 13 Israeli soldiers. The soldiers were protected from serious injury by fortifications at the crossing. A second APC close to the border north of Kerem Shalom was blown up by Israeli fire soon after the bombing. Hamas claimed responsibility for the attack. According to Abu Obeidah, spokesman for Izz ad-Din al-Qassam Brigades, Hamas's military wing, four booby-trapped vehicles were used, three of which exploded and one withdrew. He described it as "a gift for the people under siege" and "a purely military operation".

=== 2012 attack; easing of restrictions ===
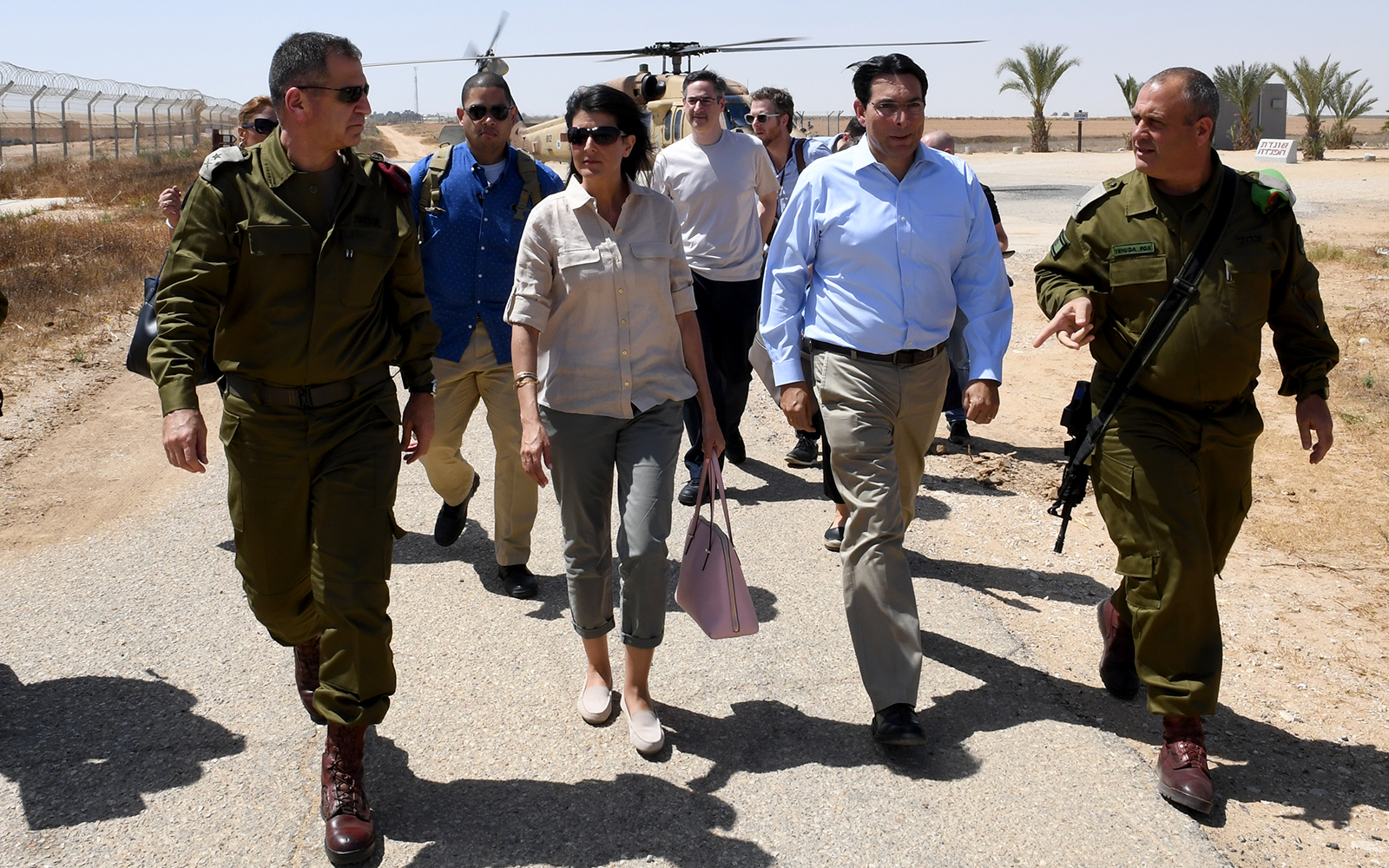
Danny Danon and Nikki Haley at the Kerem Shalom border crossing in June 2017

On 5 August 2012, the crossing was attacked by a group of masked gunmen who had killed 16 police officers and hijacked armored jeeps from an Egyptian border checkpoint. One jeep, apparently booby-trapped, rammed the checkpoint and exploded; the other was destroyed by the Israeli Air Force.

In December 2012, Israel eased its restrictions on the import of building materials, allowing the transfer of 20 truckloads of aggregates and 34 truckloads of gravel from Egypt. The volume is expected to increase to 100 trucks a day.

=== 2018: Hamas tunnel into Israel ===
On 14 January 2018, Israeli Air Force planes demolished a "terror tunnel" that passed under the Kerem Shalom Crossing from Gaza into Israel. The Israeli Defense Force said the tunnel belonged to Hamas. The tunnel started in the Rafiah area 900 meters (2,953 feet) into Gaza and extended 180 meters (591 feet) into Israel. It passed under the gas pipeline between Egypt and Gaza."

=== 2018 arson attacks ===
In May 2018, Palestinian rioters set parts of the Kerem Shalom crossing ablaze three times, causing significant damage to infrastructure, including fuel pipelines and conveyor belts. Israeli authorities shut the crossing for a few days to assess damage before reopening it. On 9 July 2018, Israel closed the Kerem Shalom crossing for all deliveries (except humanitarian deliveries), in retaliation for attacks against Israel using incendiary kites and balloons. The border crossing was reopened in mid-August 2018, after a few weeks of calm.

=== 2019 rocket attacks, closure ===
In March 2019, Israeli authorities closed the Kerem Shalom and Erez crossings for a week in response to renewed Palestinian rocket attacks, launched from Gaza, against Israel. Both border crossings were reopened a week later, following Egyptian mediation.

=== 2023 Islamic Jihad attack ===
In May 2023, during Gaza-Israel clashes, Palestinian Islamic Jihad launched dozens of rockets at the Kerem Shalom and Erez crossings. The crossings were shuttered after Israel launched Operation Shield and Arrow in response, but the Coordinator of Government Activities in the Territories (COGAT) announced, a few days later, a gradual reopening of both crossings. In early September 2023, Israeli officials halted commercial exports from Gaza after inspectors discovered several kilograms of "high-quality explosives" concealed in an apparel shipment. Later that month, the Kerem Shalom crossing was reopened, allowing shipments of goods and fuel to resume. The Erez crossing remained closed at the time.

=== 2023 Hamas attack, war ===
Before the 7 October attacks, around 500 aid trucks passed through the Kerem Shalom crossing into Gaza each day. In October 2023, Karem Shalom was one of several targets attacked by Hamas as part of a coordinated multi-front assault on Israel, a surprise attack that caught Israel off-guard. The crossing had been scheduled to be closed during that day's Simchat Torah holiday, other than for humanitarian and medical supplies. The crossing was at first kept closed during the ensuing IDF operations. On 22 October, the Israel Defense Forces apologised for accidentally firing and hitting an Egyptian post adjacent to the border area.

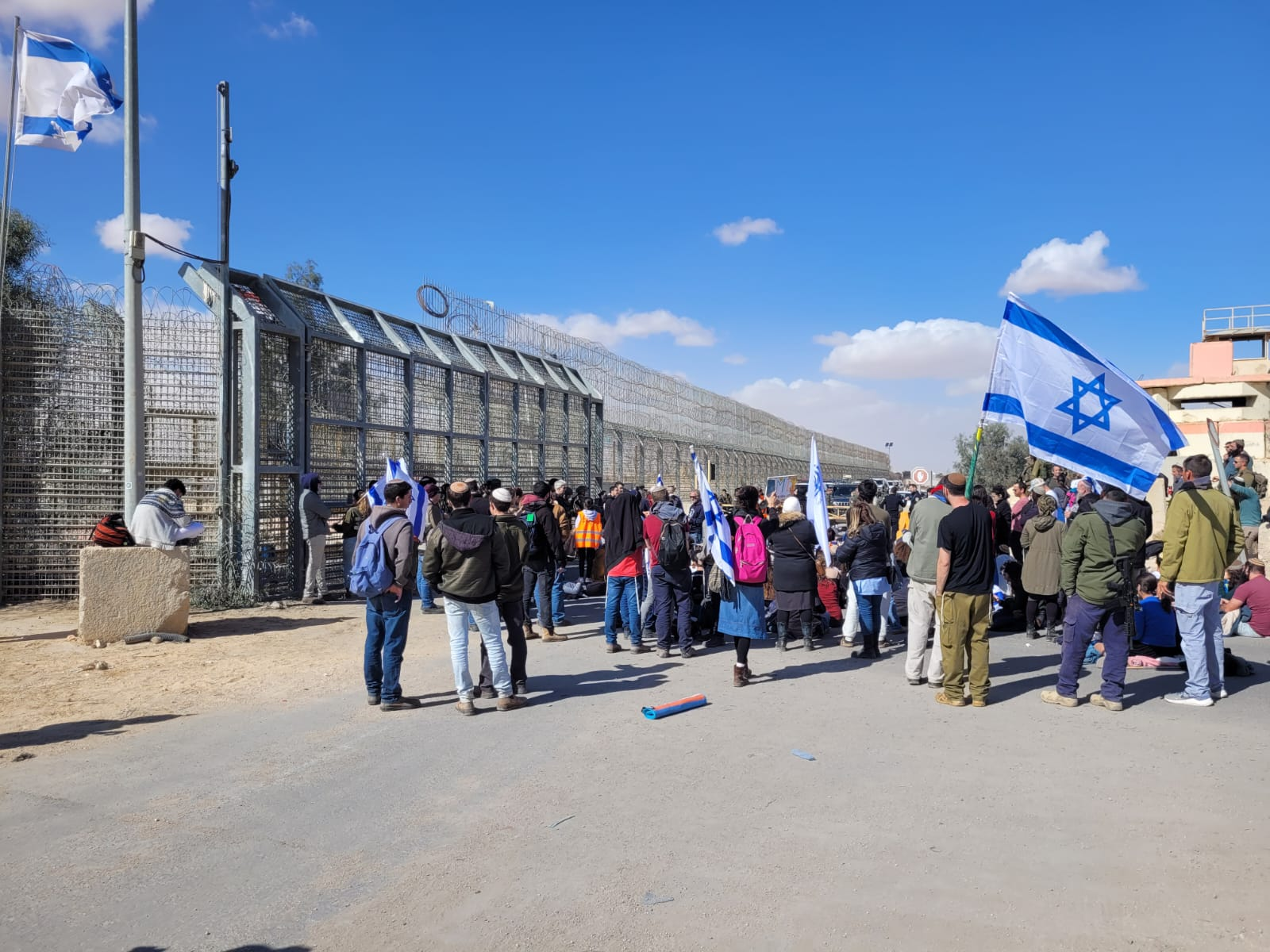
Israeli demonstrating against the entrance of humanitarian aid trucks to the Gaza Strip at the Kerem Shalom border crossing, February 2024

The crossing was reopened for UN aid trucks on 17 December 2023, to abide by an agreement made during the hostages-for-prisoners exchanges, with 100 trucks of humanitarian aid being allowed through daily to add to the 100 permitted through the Rafah Border Crossing. X-ray scanners were donated by the Netherlands in December 2023, although aid trucks still undergo manual inspections. Israeli protesters accusing Israel of helping its enemy and harming own troops, repeatedly blocked the Kerem Shalom crossing to prevent humanitarian aid from entering the Gaza Strip. The crossing was again closed on 5 May 2024 following a rocket attack on an Israeli military base, but was reopened for humanitarian aid on 8 May 2024.

On 16 November 2024, armed gangs raided a convoy of 109 UN aid trucks and looted 98 of them, near Israeli military installations at the Kerem Shalom border crossing. The perpetrators, who according to a UN memo may have had "protection" from the IDF, threw grenades and held truck drivers at gunpoint, forcing them to unload their aid. The UN also reported that a gang leader had established a "military-like compound" in an area that was "restricted, controlled, and patrolled by the IDF". The incident has been described by the UNRWA as "one of the worst" incidents of its kind.

On 2 March 2025, Israel stopped all delivery of trucks with aid across the Kerem Shalom crossing. On 19 May, the first five trucks were allowed in.

On 10 October 2025, the day of the Hamas-Israel ceasefire, a UN spokesperson said that fuel, medical supplies, and other essential goods had begun entering Gaza through the Kerem Shalom crossing. On 12 October, Israel’s deputy foreign minister Sharren Haskel said that humanitarian aid had been entering Gaza through the Kerem Shalom crossing even before the ceasefire, accusing some aid organisations of being used as a political tool against Israel. Aid agencies, however, reported that they still lacked permission to deliver supplies and that no significant increase in shipments had yet occurred.

== See also ==
- Kerem Shalom
