= European Union Border Assistance Mission to Rafah =

Civilian Crisis Management Mission in Gaza

- Abbreviation: EU BAM Rafah
- Formation: 24 November 2005
- Headquarters: Tel Aviv, Israel
- Head of Mission: Nataliya Apostolova
- Parent organization: European Union
- Website: http://www.eubam-rafah.eu

The European Union Border Assistance Mission at the Rafah Crossing Point (EUBAM Rafah) is the European Union's second Civilian Crisis Management Mission in the Palestinian territories, the other being the EU Police Mission (EUPOL COPPS).

The Mission was launched on 24 November 2005 to monitor operations at the Rafah Border Crossing between the Gaza Strip and Egypt, in accordance with the Agreed Principles for Rafah Crossing of 15 November 2005, part of the Agreement on Movement and Access (AMA), concluded by Israel and the Palestinian Authority. When the Mission was first deployed, it consisted of roughly 70 personnel including a special security team.

On 13 June 2007, following Hamas's takeover of the Gaza Strip, the EUBAM Head of Mission declared a temporary suspension of operations at the Crossing because the Palestinian Authority could not provide security for the EU monitors. During the 19 months while the monitors were present at the terminal (i.e., from the end of November 2005 until June 2007), a total of nearly 450,000 persons used the crossing, with an average of about 1,500 people a day. Since 2007, the European Union has had a policy of no contact with Hamas.

In 2015, EUBAM Rafah started implementing the ‘Palestinian Authority Preparedness Project’, aimed at enhancing the Palestinian Authority’s General Administration for Borders and Crossings (GABC) to operate according to international standards and to maintaining its readiness to redeploy to the Rafah Crossing Point, once the situation allows.

== Political background ==
The Rafah Border Crossing is vitally important to the Gaza economy and the viability of any future independent Palestinian state, since it is the Gaza Strip's only border crossing with a country other than Israel. Furthermore, after the withdrawal of Israel Defense Forces (IDF) from the Gaza Strip and the subsequent closure of the Rafah Crossing Point (RCP), trade relations with neighboring Egypt were inhibited. Given Israeli security-related concerns about handing over control of the RCP to the Palestinian Authority (possible weapons transfers and uninhibited return of exiled extremist leaders and terrorists), EUBAM Rafah's stated aim is to provide a third party presence in the RCP in order to, in cooperation with the European Commission's institution building efforts, contribute to the opening of the Rafah Crossing Point and to build up confidence between the Government of Israel and the Palestinian Authority.

Furthermore, the broader political objective is to support the Road Map peace initiative through confidence-building and increasing Palestinian capacity in all aspects of border control. Effective border management will facilitate the movement of goods and persons in and out of the Gaza Strip, thus improving the living conditions of the Palestinians and enhancing the prospects of viability of a Palestinian State, while contributing to the security of Israel.

== Organisation ==
The EUBAM is a civilian and unarmed Mission, composed mainly of Police, Border Police and Customs officers. It was originally intended to have the Mission in the Gaza Strip in a special-built compound at Rafah Crossing Point (RCP), with the Mission Headquarters in Gaza City. However, due to security, the headquarters is currently based in Tel Aviv, Israel, being previously located in Ashkelon. The Mission also has a field office in Gaza city.

The number of personnel has been considerably reduced. Despite the suspension of operations at the RCP in June 2007, EUBAM has maintained its capacity to redeploy to the RCP. The Mission retains its expertise in Border Management and Customs Operations and is regularly approached to share its expertise with other stakeholders involved in the issue of Border and Crossing. The mission is also liaising with the parties on a regular basis and on the operational level.

== Tasks ==
Tasks of the EUBAM Rafah are:

1. actively monitor, verify and evaluate the PA's performance with regard to the implementation of the Framework, Security and Customs Agreements concluded between the parties on the operation of the Rafah terminal;
2. contribute, through mentoring, to building up the Palestinian capacity in all aspects of border management at Rafah.
3. contribute to the liaison between the Palestinian, Israeli and Egyptian authorities in all aspects regarding the management of the Rafah Crossing Point.

The EU considers maintaining the acquis of the AMA and the EU's third party role as important and stands ready to redeploy to the crossing point should the political and security conditions allow. The RCP was opened by Egypt on 28 May 2011 and has been operating outside the scope of the AMA ever since.

== History ==
Until 2007, EUBAM Rafah monitors would use the Kerem Shalom border crossing to get to the Rafah Border Crossing. The EUBAM headed a Liaison Office at Kerem Shalom which received real-time video and data feeds of activities at the Rafah crossing. The live feed would also be received by Israeli monitors. The Liaison Office met regularly to review implementation of the Agreed Principles for Rafah Crossing, to resolve any dispute pertaining to the agreement, and to perform other tasks specified therein. The Liaison Office was staffed by officers from EUBAM, the Palestinian Authority, and the Israeli government.

On 13 June 2007, following the Hamas take over in the Gaza Strip, the EUBAM Head of Mission declared a temporary suspension of operations at the Rafah Crossing Point (RCP).

In October 2014, EUBAM Rafah launched its PA Preparedness Project aimed at enhancing the PA capabilities for a quick redeployment to the RCP and PA's potential for future operating the RCP.

On 1 July 2015, Natalina Cea was appointed Head of EUBAM Rafah by the EU's Political and Security Committee. As of 2015, the Mission was only partially staffed. The EU Council has expressed its readiness to reactivate the EUBAM Rafah Mission, once political and security conditions allow. As of 2015, neither of the Parties of the 2005 Agreement (the Palestinian Authority and Israel) has formally requested the EU to reactivate and redeploy the Border Assistance Mission in Rafah.

In January 2025, EUBAM was redeployed, though operations were again halted in March. As part of the Gaza war peace plan accepted by Israel and Hamas on 8 October 2025, the operations at the Rafah border crossing are to resume after 16 October under EUBAM supervision. In contrast to the arrangement announced in January, when the EU described the mission’s main purpose as coordinating and assisting the daily transfer of up to 300 injured or sick people, Italian defense minister Guido Crosetto stated that the new plan would allow anyone to cross, subject to the mutual consent of Israel and Egypt. On 2 February 2026, the crossing was reopened under EUBAM supervision.

== See also ==
- Kerem Shalom
- Rafah Border Crossing
- European Union Border Assistance Mission to Moldova and Ukraine (EUBAM Moldova and Ukraine)
