= Grisha Yakubovich =

Grisha Yakubovich (Hebrew: גרישה יקובוביץ; born 3 October 1967) is the former head of the Civil Department for the Coordinator of Government Activities in the Territories (COGAT), a unit that oversees economic and infrastructural projects and the facilitation of humanitarian issues in the Palestinian territories. He concluded his military service in 2016 as an Israel Defense Forces (IDF) colonel, with thirty years of experience. He now works as a policy and strategy consultant to various international NGOs, private companies, and research institutes, on cooperative projects between Israelis, Palestinians, and international businesses in the public and private sectors.

== Military career ==
Colonel Yakubovich served as head of the Civil Coordination Department of COGAT, overseeing economic projects, infrastructural projects, and the facilitation of humanitarian projects in the Palestinian territories. The infrastructure projects included water systems, sewage systems, gas and electricity lines, telecommunication structures, and environmental protection. He also took part in coordination and liaison efforts with the Palestinian Authority (PA) and the Palestinian population, and connected them with international bodies such as NGOs and consulates.

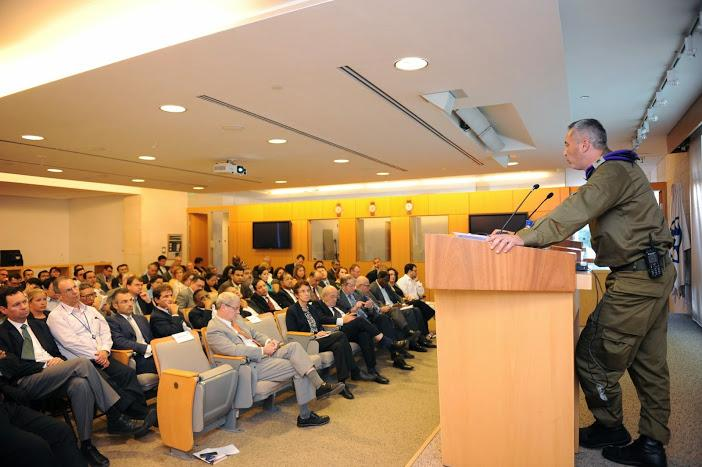
Col. Grisha Yakubovich, Head of the Civil Coordination Department, COGAT, briefing foreign ambassadors in Israel on the humanitarian situation in the Gaza Strip, 31 July 2014

Yakubovich helped manage supply chains between Israel, Palestine, and the international community during Operation Protective Edge. This included the supply of critical resources such as food, water, and medicine. He managed a joint international, Israeli, and Palestinian system that allowed for the continuous transfer of food, water, resources, and reconstruction materials.

He also worked with Palestinians in economic and business spheres in the West Bank and Gaza Strip.

== Post-military career ==
After his military service, Yakubovich has worked as a policy and strategy consultant for private companies, non-governmental organizations, and governmental agencies in Israel, Europe, and the United States. He worked with Nesher Israel Cement Enterprises to develop the West Bank and Gaza market.

Additionally, he provides lectures and briefings to various delegations and conferences, including European diplomats, members of the UN, journalists, law enforcement agencies, organizations, federations, and academic institutions.

== Media presence ==
Yakubovich has appeared as a live commentator on Israeli and international media outlets speaking about the Israeli–Palestinian conflict, Hamas, Hezbollah, Egypt, and Gaza, among other topics. He has appeared on channels such as BBC, CNN, Fox News, ABC 7, and i24NEWS. He also contributes written analysis, interviews, and commentary on the Israeli–Palestinian conflict as a senior analyst at the Miryam Institute.
