= Rafah Border Crossing =

Egypt–Palestine border crossing

Rafah Border Crossing معبر رفح
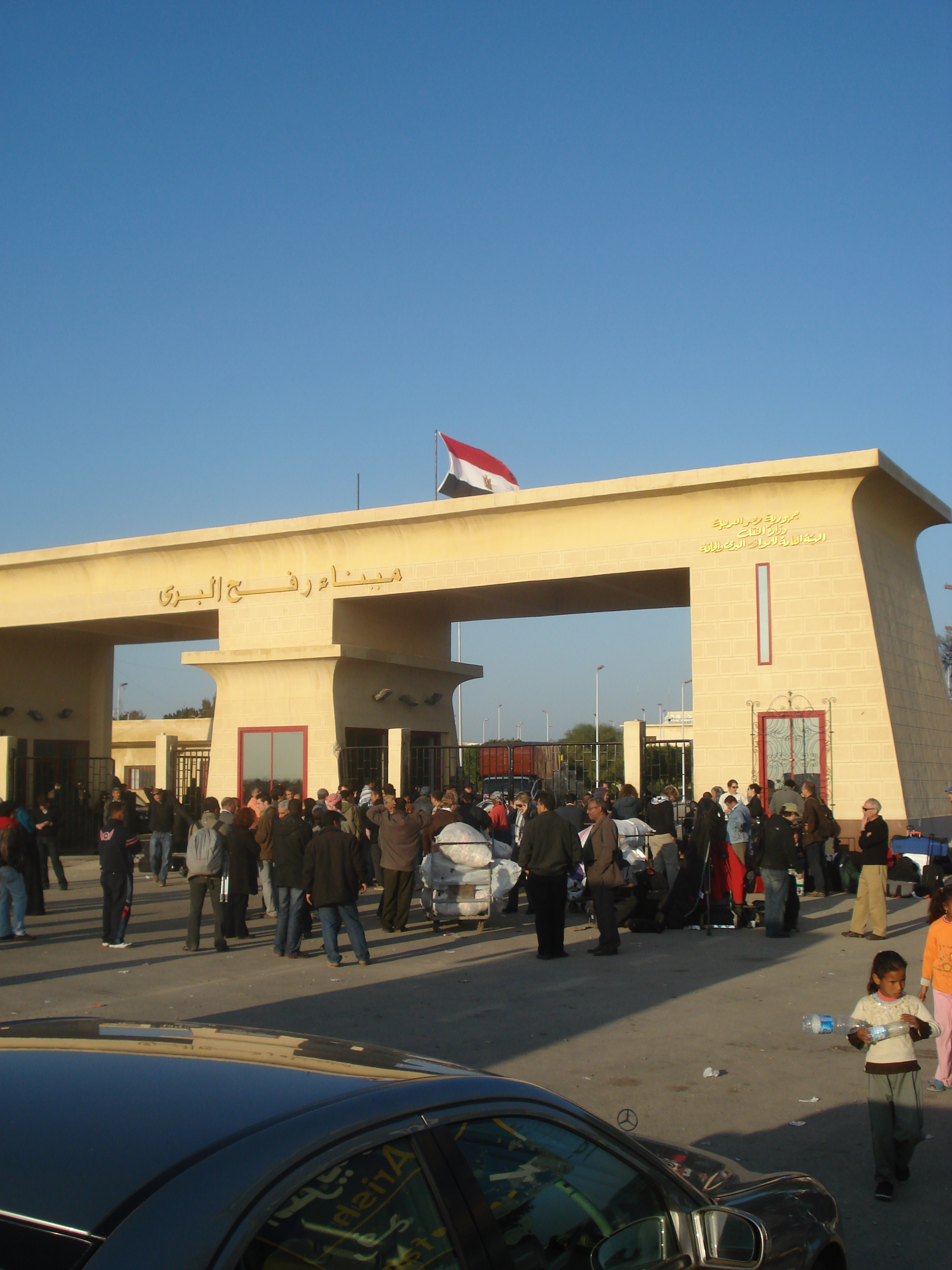
- Rafah Crossing Point
- Coordinates: 31°14′55″N 34°15′33″E
- Crosses: Gaza–Egypt border
- Locale: Rafah, Egypt (Palestine) Rafah, Gaza Strip
- Maintained by: (Egypt) Border Guard Corps (Egyptian side); European Union Border Assistance Mission to Rafah, Palestinian Authority (Gazan side)

Location
- Interactive map of Rafah Border Crossing

The Rafah Border Crossing (Arabic: معبر رفح, romanized: Ma`bar Rafaḥ), also known as the Rafah Crossing Point and referred to by Egyptian authorities as the Rafah land port, is the sole crossing point between Egypt and Palestine's Gaza Strip and Gaza's sole border point with a country other than Israel. The Rafah crossing was opened by Israel after the 1979 peace treaty and remained under Israeli control until Israel's disengagement from Gaza in 2005, when it was transferred to Egyptian, Palestinian Authority, and EU control (EUBAM Rafah), giving Palestinians partial control of an international border for the first time.

In 2007, after Hamas seized Gaza, the EU withdrew, and Israel imposed a complete blockade, effectively sealing Gaza. In the same year, Egypt closed the Rafah crossing. Since then, the Rafah crossing has only opened intermittently for Palestinian movement. Under a 2007 agreement between Egypt and Israel, Egypt controls the crossing but imports through the Rafah crossing require Israeli approval.

During the Gaza war, Israel took control of the crossing on 7 May 2024, withdrew under a ceasefire agreement in January 2025, and reoccupied it in March. The crossing was reopened under later ceasefire arrangements on 2 February 2026.

== Location and infrastructure ==
The Rafah Border Crossing is located at the original Rafah crossing on the Salah al-Din Road, the main highway of Gaza from Erez to Rafah.

Rafah land port was bombed by Israel in October 2009 allegedly to destroy tunnels. A new Rafah Crossing Point, sometimes referred to in Arabic as "Al Awda" ("The Return"), was constructed south of the town of Rafah. Separately, a commercial gate—known as the "Salah al-Din Gate"—was first opened in 2018 along Salah al-Din Road and is used for truck traffic between Egypt and Gaza.

== History ==
=== 1906 Ottoman-British border agreement ===
By the Ottoman–British agreement of 1 October 1906, a border between Ottoman-ruled Palestine and British-ruled Egypt, from Taba to Rafah, was agreed upon.

=== 1948–1979: Occupations and wars ===
From 1948, Gaza was occupied by Egypt. Consequently, a Gaza–Egypt border no longer existed. In the 1967 Six-Day War, Israel conquered both the Gaza Strip and the Sinai Peninsula from Egypt, both becoming occupied territories.

=== 1982–2005: Israel-Egypt border at Rafah ===
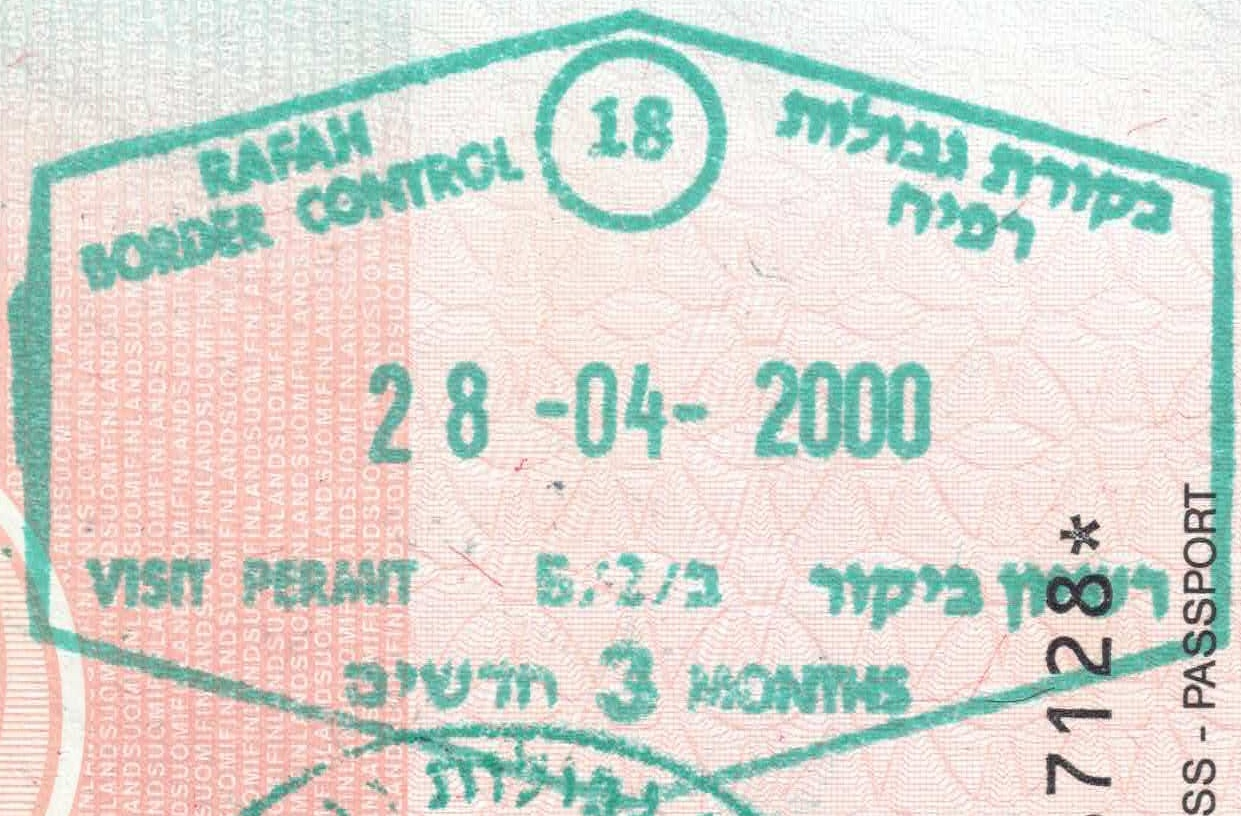
Visit permit issued by Israeli authorities at the Rafah border, 2000

In 1979, Israel and Egypt signed a peace treaty that eventually returned the Sinai, which borders the Gaza Strip, to Egyptian control. As part of that treaty, a 100-meter-wide strip of land known as the Philadelphi Corridor was established as a buffer zone between Gaza and Egypt. In the Peace Treaty, the re-created Gaza–Egypt border was drawn across the city of Rafah. When Israel withdrew from the Sinai in 1982, Rafah was divided into an Egyptian and a Palestinian part, splitting up families, separated by barbed-wire barriers.

=== 2005: Israel disengages; Egypt-Palestinian border ===
On 16 February 2005, the Israeli parliament approved the plan for the Israeli disengagement from the Gaza Strip. Israel withdrew from Gaza in September 2005, after which the Rafah Border Crossing was temporarily closed. Egypt continued to exercise control on the Egyptian side of the Gaza–Egypt border. Under the November 2005 Agreement on Movement and Access (AMA), the Fatah-dominated Palestinian Authority assumed administrative responsibility for the Gazan side of the border crossing, with EU monitors overseeing operations.

The Philadelphi Accord between Israel and Egypt, based on the principles of the 1979 peace treaty, provided for the deployment of 750 Egyptian border guards along the length of the border. Both Egypt and Israel pledged to work together to prevent terrorism, arms smuggling, and other illegal cross-border activities. The agreement also granted Israel the authority to dispute the entry of any individual through the crossing.

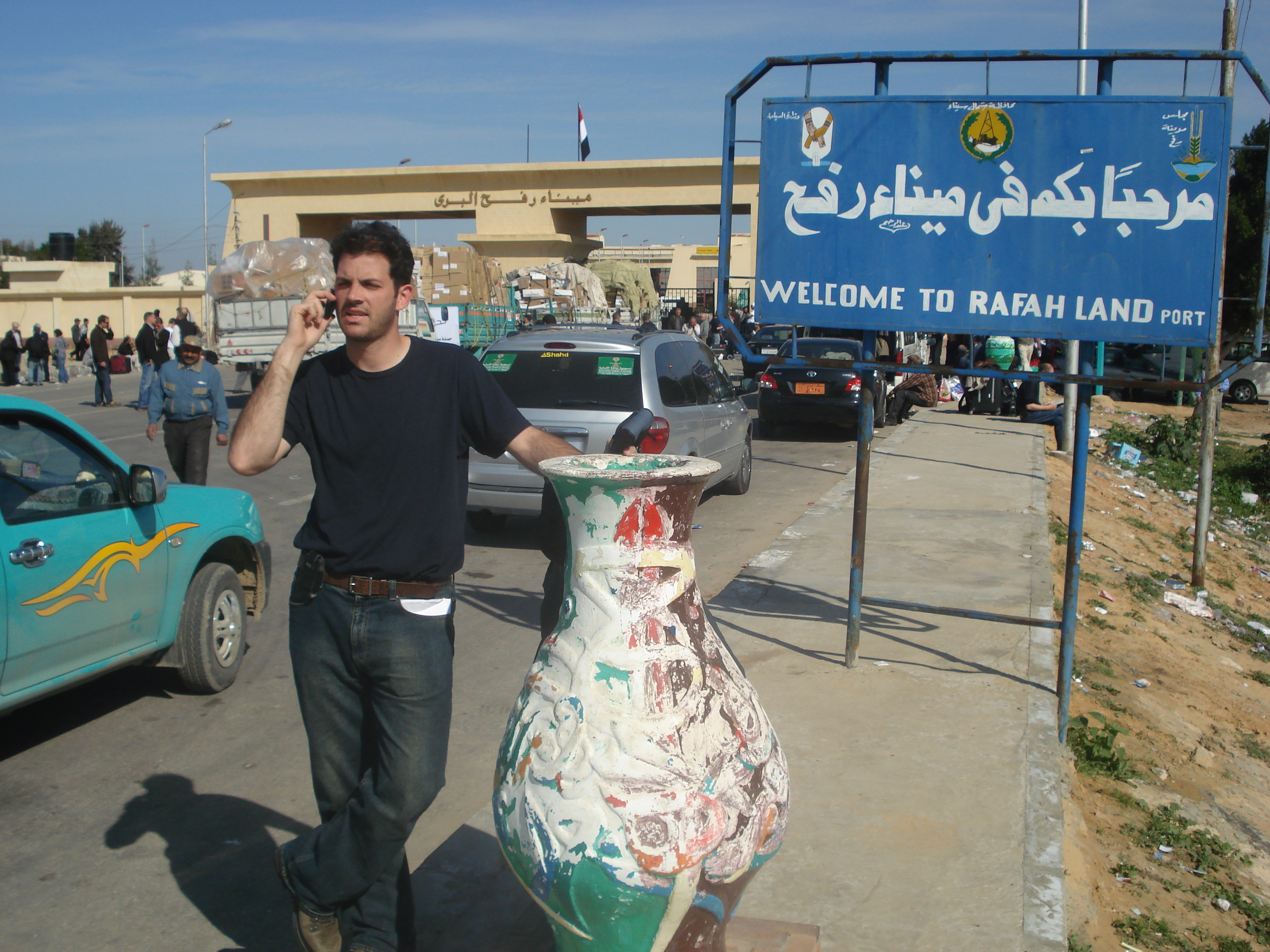
Egyptian side of the Rafah land port in 2009.

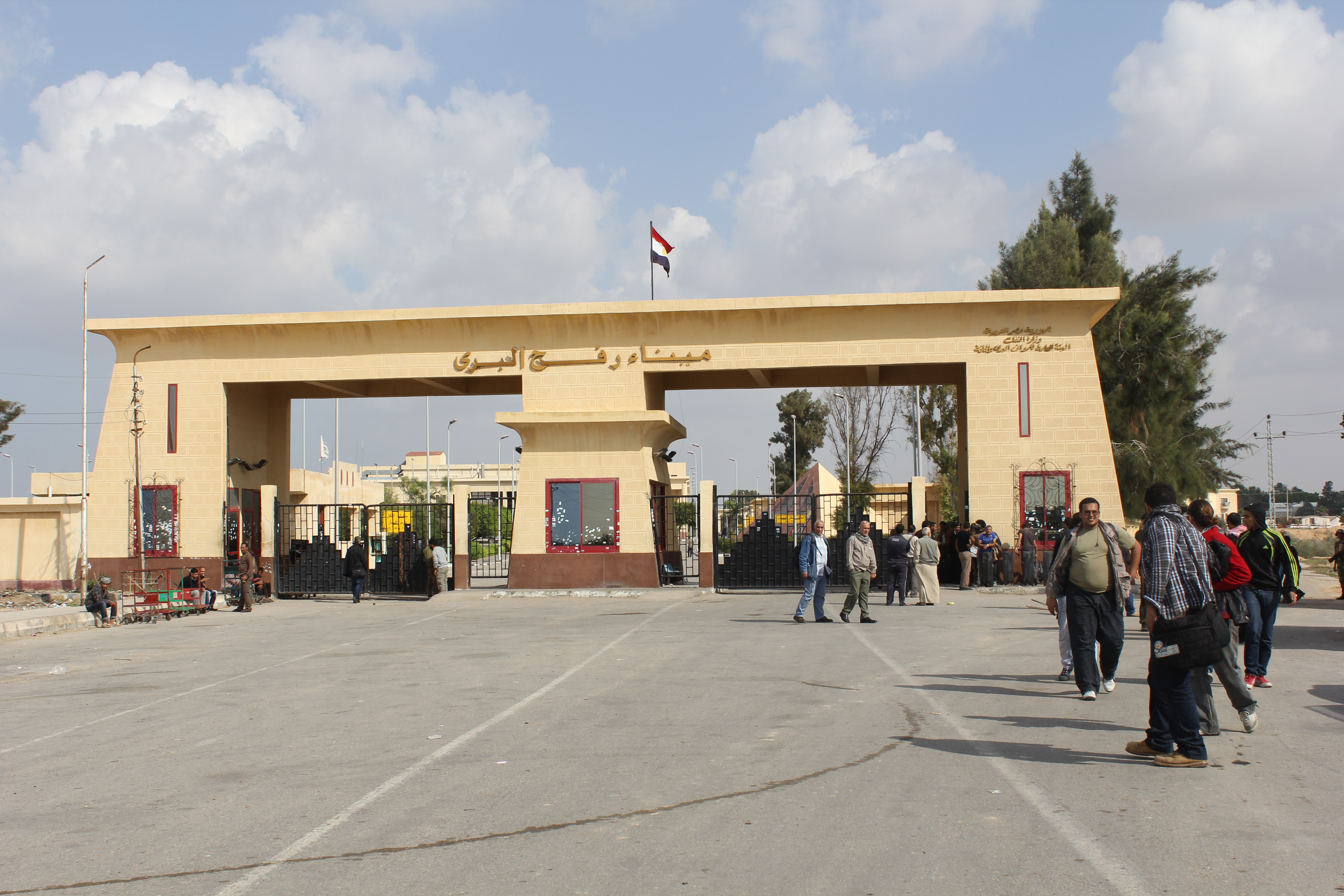
Rafah Border Crossing in 2012.

The AMA principles for Rafah stipulate that "Rafah will also be used for export of goods to Egypt". However, a confidential PLO document revealed that Egypt under president Hosni Mubarak did not permit such exports. All imports of goods were diverted to the Israeli-controlled Kerem Shalom border crossing, reportedly because Israel threatened to exclude Gaza from the customs union over concerns about the Paris Protocol implementation. The Palestinians agreed to the diversion in order to reduce Israeli interference at Rafah and maximize their sovereignty. Although intended as a temporary measure, imports through Rafah were never implemented, leading to the rise of a smuggling tunnel economy.

Israel consistently tried to turn the Kerem Shalom border crossing-adjacent to Egypt-into Gaza's main commercial or even passenger crossing between Gaza and Israel. The Palestinian side opposed this, fearing that it would give Israel de facto control over the Gaza-Egypt border or potentially replace Rafah altogether.

On 26 November 2005, the Rafah crossing opened for the first time under the European Union's supervision. The Israeli army maintained video surveillance from a nearby base and retained control over the movement of all goods and trade into and out of Gaza. The agreement allowed Gazans with Palestinian ID cards to pass through. For seven months, the crossing functioned smoothly, with around 1,320 people crossing each day. The reopening of the Rafah Crossing allowed Palestinians greater freedom of movement and access to international travel. It also opened possibilities for trade that could help revive the economy and improve humanitarian conditions. In addition, it gave the Palestinian Authority a chance to directly manage a border crossing and showcase the competence of its personnel.

From November 2005 to July 2007, the Rafah Crossing was jointly controlled by Egypt and the Palestinian Authority, with the European Union monitoring Palestinian compliance on the Gaza side. In January 2006, Hamas won the Palestinian elections and subsequently formed a government. The Rafah Crossing operated daily until June 2006. However, the terms of the Agreement were regularly breached as Hamas representatives began transporting large sums of cash across the border from Egypt. Despite border checks identifying many of these transfers—often exceeding a million dollars—the EU BAM monitors lacked the authority to stop them from entering Gaza. Despite the strict security arrangements, the EU BAM presence failed to prevent certain wanted individuals from entering Gaza. In December 2005, several Hamas members previously expelled by Israel crossed the Rafah border, prompting Israeli protests. Israeli prime minister Ariel Sharon warned of closing all Gaza border crossings if control measures were not upheld. Following talks with Israeli officials, Egyptian president Hosni Mubarak pledged to enhance security at the crossing. Palestinian authorities, however, insisted that any holder of Palestinian citizenship had the right to pass through Rafah.

=== 2006 to 2007 ===
On 23 June 2006, Israel issued security warnings that prevented European monitors from travelling to the terminal. In their absence, the Rafah crossing was required to close, leaving hundreds of Palestinians stranded. This was not the first time Israel had closed Rafah. In response, the Hamas-led PA Government threatened to terminate the Rafah border-crossing agreement if the border would not be reopened.

On 25 June 2006, Palestinian militants attacked the Kerem Shalom border crossing and captured the Israeli soldier Gilad Shalit. Israel then closed the Rafah crossing, citing security concerns. It was subsequently opened only sporadically and without prior notice. Between then and June 2007, it remained closed for 265 days.

In 2007, Hamas seized control of the Gaza strip in a conflict with Fatah. Israel announced that it was suspending the Crossings Agreement. The Palestinian personnel designated to operate the crossing under the Palestinian Authority could no longer access the site after Hamas seized control of Gaza. Israel opposed reopening the crossing, citing its inability to oversee who was passing through. Egypt kept the border shut as the Crossings Agreement could not be implemented under the new conditions. The European monitoring team also withdrew, in line with the EU's policy of non-engagement with Hamas. Consequently, since June 2007, the crossing has remained closed under the terms of the original agreement. Egypt, although able to open its side, has largely refrained from doing so, effectively aligning with Israel's blockade policy.

On 12 February 2007, PLO Negotiatior Saeb Erekat complained in a letter to the Israeli Government and the Head of the EU Mission about Israel, closing the Rafah Crossing Point (RCP) on most days by indirect measures, such as "preventing access by the EU BAM to the RCP through Kerem Shalom". A 2007 Palestinian background paper mentions the EU concern over crises, "most often caused by the continual Israeli closure of the Crossing". On 7 May 2007, the issue of the Israeli closure of Rafah and Kerem as well was raised at a Coordination and Evaluation meeting. The movement of ambulances via Rafah was prohibited. The EU BAM proposed the use of "shuttle" ambulances at the Crossing, requiring two additional transfers of the patients between the ambulances.

In June 2007, the Rafah Crossing was closed by the Egyptian authorities after Hamas' takeover of the Gaza Strip. Due to the lack of security the EU monitors pulled out of the region, and Egypt agreed with Israel to shut down the Rafah Crossing. The Fatah-led Palestinian Authority in the West Bank has declared that the Rafah Crossing should remain closed until the control by the Palestinian Presidential Guard is restored.

=== 2007 to 2010 ===
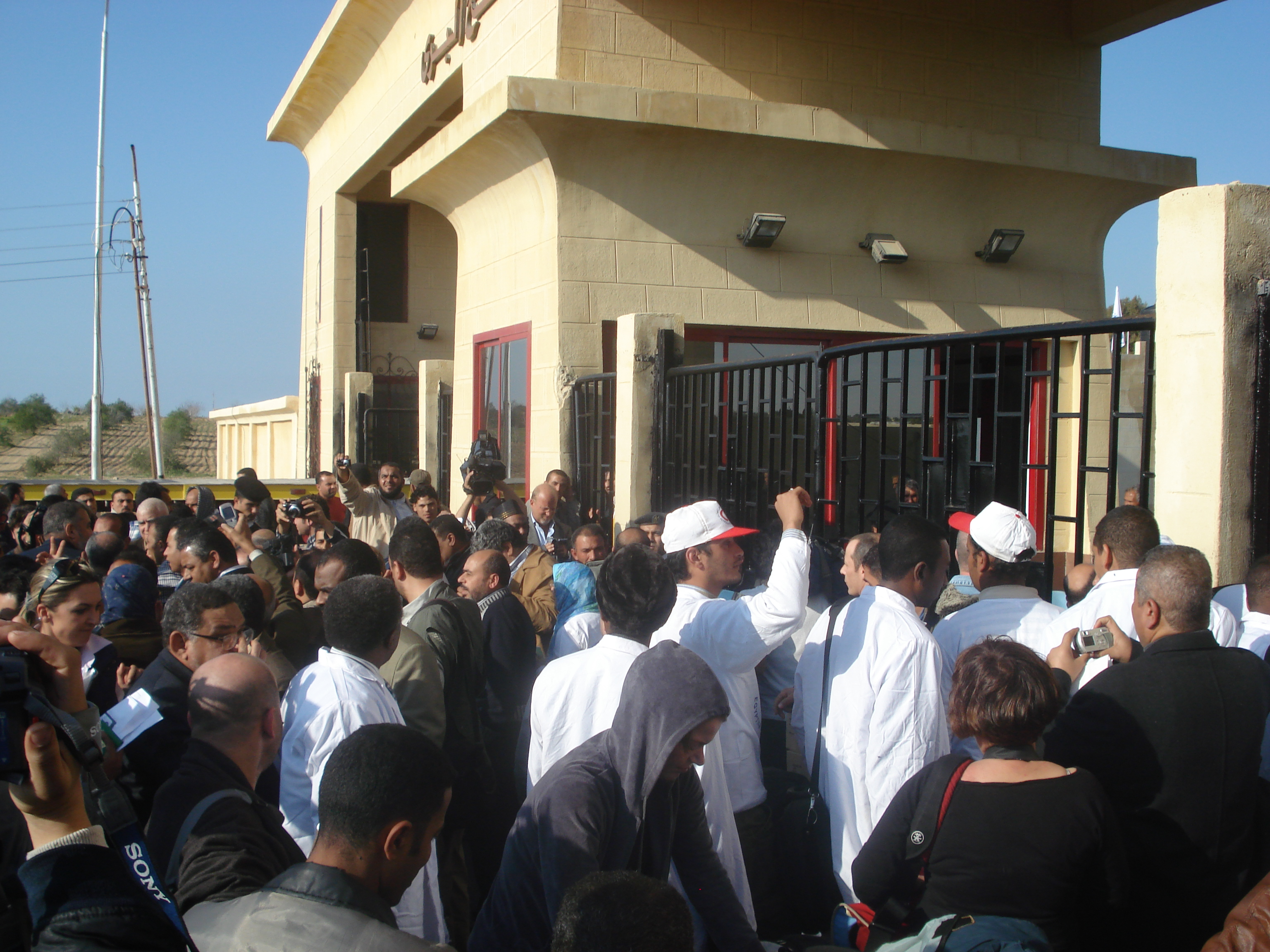
Passengers waiting at the Rafah Border Crossing in 2009

On 22 January 2008, after Israel imposed a total closure on all crossings to the Gaza Strip, a group of Hamas demonstrators attempted to force open the door of the Rafah Crossing. They were beaten back by Egyptian police and gunfire erupted. That same night, Hamas demolished a 200 metres (660 ft) length of the metal border wall with explosives. After the resulting Breach of the Gaza-Egypt border, many thousands of Palestinians, with estimates ranging from 200,000 to 700,000, crossed into Egypt to buy goods. Palestinians were seen purchasing food, fuel, cigarettes, shoes, furniture, car parts, and generators. On 3 February 2008, the border was closed again by Egypt, except for travelers returning home.

On 27 June 2009, Hamas Prime Minister Ismail Haniyeh proposed a joint Palestinian, Egyptian and European mechanism to keep the Rafah border crossing working permanently. He said: "We welcome the presence of European inspectors, the Egyptians and the Palestinian Presidential Guard in addition to the presence of the (Hamas) government in Gaza".

According to a 2009 report of Gisha, Israel continued to exercise control over the border through its control of the Palestinian population registry, which determines who is allowed to go through Rafah Crossing. It also had the power to use its right to veto the passage of foreigners, even when belonging to the list of categories of foreigners allowed to cross, and to decide to close the crossing indefinitely.

Gisha has blamed Israel for keeping the Rafah Crossing closed through indirect means and Egypt for submitting to Israeli pressure and not cooperate with the Hamas government. Hamas, however was blamed for not allowing the Presidential Guard to apply the AMA agreement. The Palestinian Authority was blamed for its refusal to compromise with Hamas over control of Rafah Crossing. The EU monitoring force was criticized for its submission to Israel's demands for closing the border, without calling for re-opening. The US was criticized for allowing human rights violations caused by the closure and avoiding pressure on Egypt.

=== 2011 to 2013 ===
The Egyptian government under former President Mubarak had opposed the Hamas administration in Gaza and helped Israel to enforce the blockade. Due to the 2011 Egyptian revolution, Mubarak was forced to step down in February 2011. On 27 April, Fatah and Hamas reached an agreement in Cairo, mediated by Egypt and on 29 April, Egypt announced that the border crossing would be opened on a permanent basis. Mahmoud Abbas and Khaled Meshal signed the Cairo agreement on 4 May 2011 and on 28 May, the crossing was re-opened. Most travel restrictions were dropped, though men between the ages of 18 and 40 entering Egypt must apply for visas and others need travel permits. Soon after the revolution, Egypt's foreign minister, Nabil el-Araby, opened discussions with Hamas aimed at easing the travel restrictions and improving relations between the two. Even though passenger restrictions were loosened, the shipment into Gaza of goods remains blocked. In the first five hours after the opening, 340 people crossed into Egypt. Under the Mubarak regime, Egypt vehemently opposed using Hamas guards at Rafah and demanded that the crossing point remain closed until Palestinian Authority personnel were deployed, but now, the crossing would be operated and guarded by Hamas policemen.

In mid-June 2011 the crossing was closed for several days and after that only a few hundred were allowed to cross each day compared with 'thousands' who applied to cross each day. Egypt reportedly agreed to allow a minimum of 500 people to cross each day.

In July 2013, in the aftermath of the overthrow of Mohamed Morsi, the border crossing was closed for several days by the Egyptian Army. It was later reopened for four hours each day. After widespread unrest in Egypt and the bloody crackdown on loyalists of ousted President Morsi on 14 August, the border crossing was closed 'indefinitely'. Afterwards, it has been opened for a few days every few months.

=== 2013 to 2020 ===
After the 2014 Israel–Gaza conflict, Egypt declared that it was prepared to train forces from the Presidential Guard to man the Rafah Crossing and deploy along the border. Once the forces were ready, Egypt would then open the crossing to full capacity. Egypt mediated a permanent truce between Israel and Hamas, and Foreign Minister Sameh Shoukri said that Egypt hoped that this would lead to the creation of a Palestinian state within the 1967 borders. Palestinian factions in Gaza, including Hamas, publicly declared their acceptance of the return of the Presidential Guard and the EU border mission.

On 22 January 2015, Egypt closed the border crossing. In March, it declared that it would only open the border crossing if the Palestinian side is staffed by Palestinian Authority employees under the full authority of the Presidential Guard and no Hamas personnel are present. Palestine Islamic Jihad (PIJ) suggested to Egyptian intelligence that PA and Hamas would open the Rafah Crossing under the supervision and in the presence of the PA and the Presidential Guard. Egyptian intelligence and Hamas appeared to agree, but the PA did not respond. Hamas accused Fatah and the PA that they "want to exclude it from political and field landscape by their insisting on the PA monopoly in controlling the crossings and borders". Hamas had agreed to let the Presidential Guard to take charge, as part of a comprehensive plan to merge employees from West Bank and Gaza Strip. Some Hamas followers voiced annoyance about the PIJ initiative, bypassing Hamas, while Egypt did not regard it a terrorist organization unlike Hamas.

However, Egypt still has occasionally allowed supplies to cross into Gaza via the Rafah Crossing, such as diesel fuel for Gaza's power plant in 2017 and gas in 2018. In May 2018, Egyptian authorities opened the crossing, permitting a couple hundred Gazans per day to cross into Egypt. As of July 2019, tens of thousands have reportedly done so, departing to destinations in the Arab world or Turkey, and some seeking refuge in Europe (particularly Belgium and Norway).

In March 2020, Palestinian authorities closed the crossing to limit the spread of the virus that causes COVID-19 to the Gaza Strip.

In early November 2020, Egyptian authorities closed the crossing to vehicles and commodities after monitoring violations by Hamas.

=== 2021 to 2023 ===
In February 2021, Egypt opened the crossing "indefinitely" for the first time in years in what was described as an effort to encourage negotiations between Palestinian factions meeting at the time in Cairo. The crossing was kept open during and after the 11-day Israel-Hamas conflict in May, delivering aid and construction materials. Egypt closed the crossing on 23 August 2021 following an escalation of cross-border incidents between Israel and Hamas, but partially reopened the crossing three days later, allowing traffic from Egypt to Gaza (but not vice versa).

=== Gaza war (2023 to 2026) ===
During the Gaza war, Israel bombed the Palestinian side of the Rafah crossing. Egypt subsequently demanded assurances that Israel will not attack aid convoys. Israel took control of the crossing during the war, and as of July 2025 it is managed by the Gaza Division of the IDF.

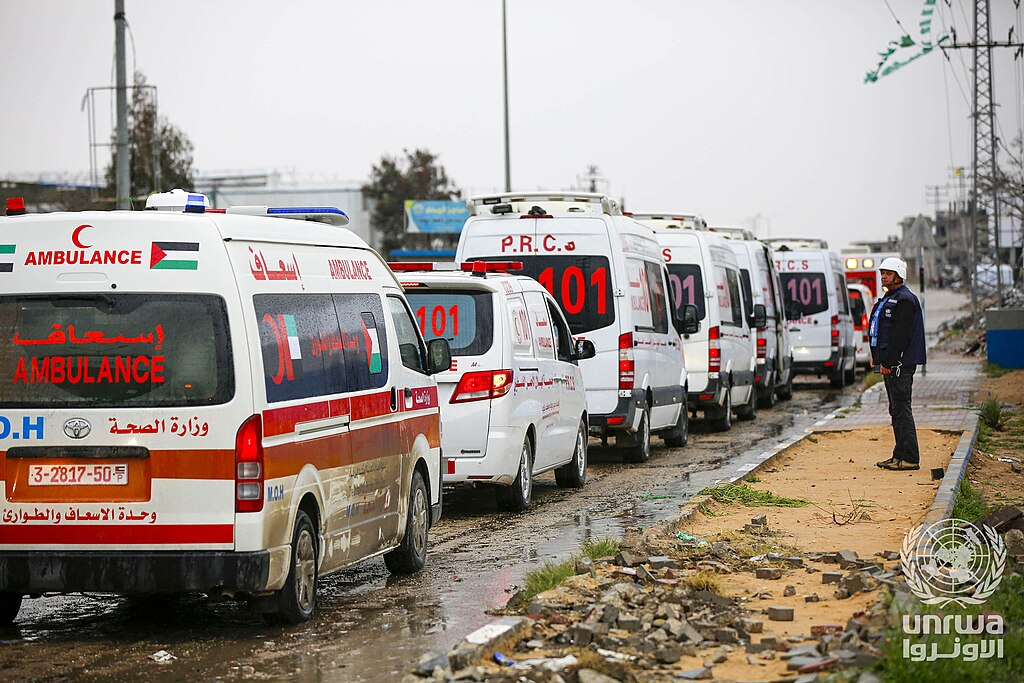
Medical evacuation of injured Palestinians through the Rafah Crossing in March 2025

In October 2023 with the start of the Gaza war, the crossing was again effectively sealed. Various sources reported that for several weeks, the Egyptian government had refused to allow either Gazans or foreign nationals to exit Gaza via the Rafah crossing, despite intensive international efforts to secure a window of time for the Rafah crossing to open to foreigners who want to exit the Strip. However, the Egyptian government, maintains that it has always kept the Rafah Border Crossing open for humanitarian aid coming in and foreign nationals coming out during the Israel–Hamas war, instead blaming four consecutive Israeli air strikes on the Gazan side for keeping the border crossing closed.

On 21 October, the border opened for humanitarian aid to enter Gaza. On 1 November 2023, a limited number of foreign nationals and wounded began being allowed to use the crossing to exit Gaza.

The crossing was seized by Israel in 2024 during the Rafah offensive. In response Egypt closed off the crossing and rejected an Israeli proposal to coordinate the reopening of the Rafah border crossing insisting that the crossing should be managed only by Palestinian authorities.

==== January 2025 Gaza war ceasefire ====
Under the January 2025 Gaza war ceasefire agreement, arrangements were outlined for the Rafah Border Crossing, which at the time was under Israeli control and was to remain so until the end of the first phase. Once all female Israeli captives (both civilians and soldiers) had been released, preparations were to begin to enable the movement of civilians and the wounded through the crossing, in coordination with Egypt. Initially, the crossing was to be used for:

- Palestinian civilians who were sick or injured and needed medical treatment in Egypt.
- Up to 50 wounded Palestinian fighters each day, each allowed to be accompanied by up to three people, with passage contingent on approval from both Israel and Egypt.

Israel was to begin preparing the crossing for operation once the agreement was signed and to adjust its military positions in the surrounding area in accordance with the attached maps. The crossing was to function under the procedures agreed with Egypt in August 2024. Israeli troops were to withdraw from the Rafah crossing and the Philadelphi Corridor along the Egyptian border by day 50.

==== October 2025 Gaza peace plan ====
The reopening of the Rafah crossing in both directions as part of the Gaza war peace plan will follow the procedures established under the January 19, 2025, agreement. Italy announced that the EU mission stationed at the Rafah border crossing between Gaza and Egypt will resume operations after the ceasefire, with the pedestrian passage scheduled to reopen on October 14. The EUBAM monitoring mission, which includes police officers from Italy, Spain, and France, is designed to serve as a neutral third-party presence at the Rafah crossing. Originally established in 2005, the mission was suspended two years later before being redeployed in January 2025, though operations were again halted in March. In contrast to the arrangement announced in January, when the EU described the mission’s main purpose as coordinating and assisting the daily transfer of up to 300 injured or sick people, Italian defense minister Guido Crosetto stated that the new plan would allow anyone to cross, subject to the mutual consent of Israel and Egypt.

On 12 October, trucks were observed entering Gaza through the Rafah crossing as humanitarian organisations worked to expand aid delivery to the war-torn territory. Israel closed the crossing again on 14 October after Hamas failed to return the bodies of several hostages. Hamas had earlier stated that locating the remains could take time, as many burial sites were still unknown amid the extensive destruction in Gaza.

The Rafah border crossing also remained closed to people seeking to leave Gaza. After the ceasefire began in October 2025, the World Health Organization estimated that around 15,000 patients required urgent medical evacuation. While the first transfers took place through the Kerem Shalom crossing, the WHO urged the reopening of Rafah to enable further evacuations.

In late January 2026, Israel announced that the reopening of the Rafah border crossing on Sunday, 1 February, under the October 2025 Gaza peace plan would be conditional and limited. The move was linked to the completion of a military operation to recover the remains of the last Israeli hostage, Ran Gvili. Israeli officials stated that any initial reopening would allow pedestrian passage only and would remain subject to Israeli security oversight, despite earlier statements by Palestinian officials indicating the crossing could reopen soon. Discussions surrounding the arrangement included the possible deployment of Palestinian Authority personnel at the crossing and monitoring by European Union observers, though Israel retained effective control over access and security procedures. On 2 February 2026, the crossing was reopened with help of EUBAM Rafah.

=== 2026 Iran war ===
Israel closed the Rafah crossing after the war with Iran began on 28 February, stating that it was unsafe to keep the crossings open. The crossing was reopened on 19 March for limited Palestinian movement under tight restrictions.

In early May 2026, EUBAM Rafah reported that more than 4,000 passengers had crossed the Rafah Crossing Point since the mission's return on 2 February 2026, with roughly as many people leaving Gaza as entering Gaza. By mid-June 2026, the figure had risen to 7000, including 1,274 people in need of medical treatment, and by 4 August, 10,128 people had crossed. During this period, the crossing was temporarily closed in early June. The crossing was open only to pedestrians, while Israel required all goods entering Gaza to pass through the Kerem Shalom crossing.

== Statistics ==
After the Israeli disengagement in 2005, the monthly average number of entries and exits through Rafah Crossing reached about 40,000, with a total of about 270,000 people who crossed the border. After the capture of Israeli soldier Gilad Shalit in June 2006, the crossing was closed 76% of the time and after Hamas' takeover of the Gaza Strip it was closed permanently except for infrequent limited openings by Egypt.

From June 2010 to January 2011, the monthly average number of exits and entries through Rafah reached 19,000. After May 2011, when Egypt's President Hosni Mubarak was replaced with Mohamed Morsi, the number grew to 40,000 per month. When Morsi was deposed by the army in July 2013, the Crossing was again almost completely shut down.

In August 2014, for the first time since the start of the Gaza blockade in 2007 Egypt allowed the United Nations World Food Programme (WFP) to bring food through the Rafah crossing. It provided food to feed around 150,000 people for 5 days. In 2014, an average of 8,119 exits and entries of people were recorded at the crossing monthly. In September 2015, it was circa 3,300, while the Gaza population numbered 1.8 million people. Between 24 October 2014 and September 2015, the crossing had been opened for only 34 days.

From 2018 until 2023, goods regularly entered Gaza from Egypt via the Rafah crossing. In October 2022, about 49% of goods that were entering Gaza entered from Egypt via Rafah, while the other 51% of goods entered Gaza via Israel. About three-quarters of goods imported via Rafah consisted of construction materials, while much of the remaining one-quarter was food.

== See also ==
- Gaza–Israel barrier
- Kerem Shalom border crossing
- Egypt–Palestine relations
