= Gaza–Israel barrier =

Border barrier between the Palestinian Gaza Strip and Israel

Map of the Gaza Strip in September 2023

The Gaza–Israel barrier (sometimes called the Iron Wall) is an Israeli border barrier located on the Israeli side of the Gaza–Israel border. Before the Gaza war, the Erez Crossing, in the north of the Gaza Strip, was the only crossing point for people and goods coming from Israel into the Gaza Strip. A second crossing point, the Kerem Shalom border crossing, is used exclusively for goods coming from Egypt as Israel did not allow goods to go directly from Egypt into Gaza through the Egypt–Gaza border, except for the Salah Al Din Gate, which opened in 2018.

A fence along the border was first constructed by Israel in 1971 as a security barrier, and has been rebuilt and upgraded since. It was constructed by Israel to control the movement of people as well as goods between the Gaza Strip and Israel, which it could not achieve by normal border crossings.

There is also one crossing along the Egypt–Gaza border, the Rafah Crossing, which is limited to the crossing of people; as per Israel's demand, any cargo or goods that are to enter Gaza must go through Israel, usually through the Kerem Shalom border crossing.

== Political background ==
In 1993, Israel and the Palestine Liberation Organization signed the first of the Oslo Accords establishing the Palestinian Authority with limited administrative control of the West Bank and Gaza Strip. Pursuant to the Accords, Israel continues to maintain control of the Gaza Strip's airspace, land borders (with the exception of Gaza's border with Egypt, abandoned by Israel in 2005), and territorial waters.

In 2005, Israel unilaterally withdrew its troops from the Gaza Strip, along with thousands of Israeli settlers. Israel thus claims to have ended the occupation. However, this claim has been challenged on the basis that Israel continues to exercise control over Gaza's territorial waters and airspace, despite Gaza not being part of Israel and Gazans not having Israeli passports.

The Gaza-Israel border straddles one of the starkest economic contrasts in the world (the Korean Demilitarized Zone is the other): on the Israeli side GDP per capita is $55,000 and population density is low, while on the Palestinian side, the GDP per capita is $1,250 and population density is among the highest in the world.

== Barrier structure ==
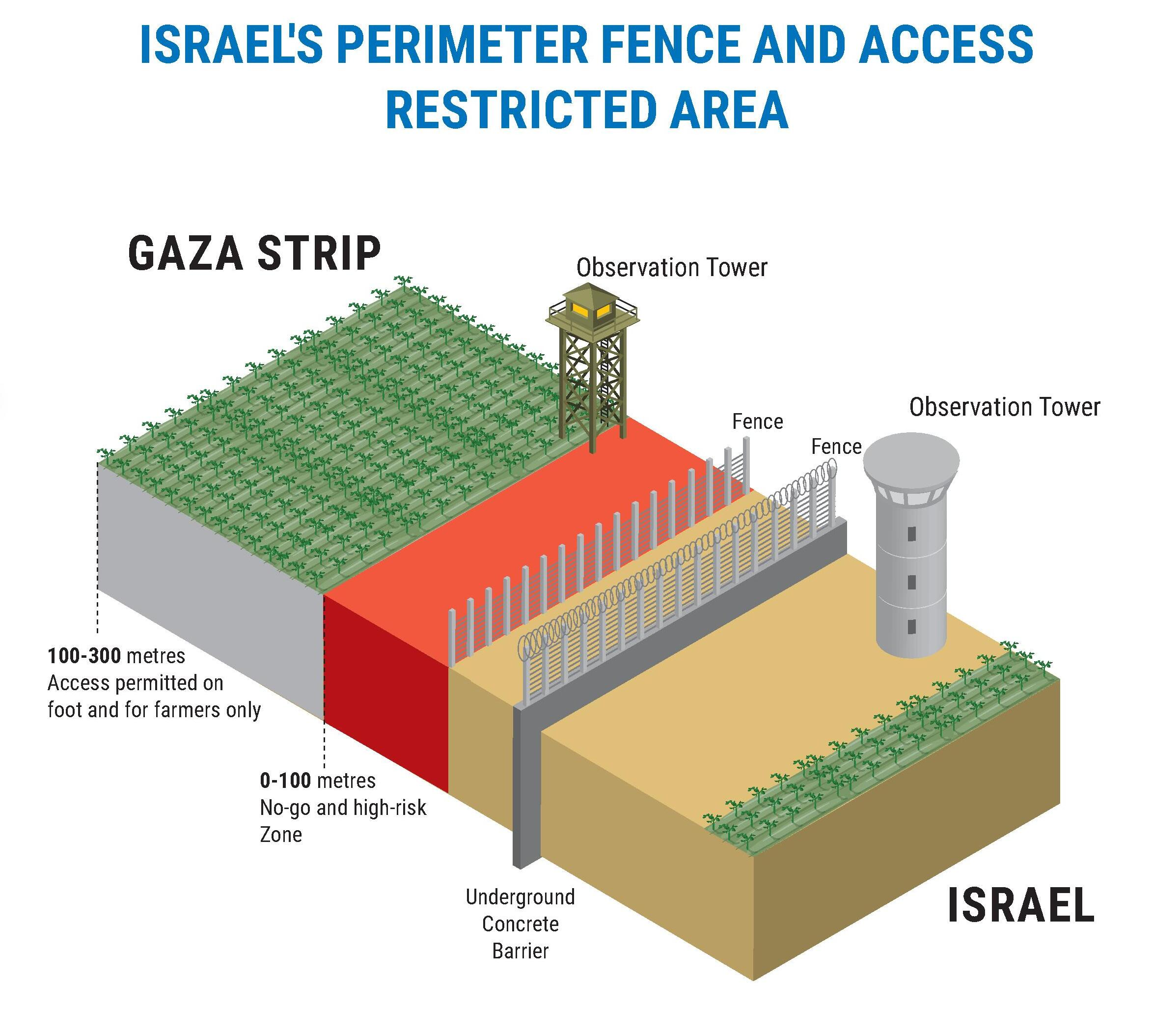
Section of the border barrier showing restrictions, September 2023.

Israel started construction of the first 60 kilometers (37 mi) long barrier along its border with the Gaza Strip in 1994. In the 1994 Interim Agreement on the West Bank and the Gaza Strip, it was agreed that "the security fence erected by Israel around the Gaza Strip shall remain in place and that the line demarcated by the fence, as shown on the map, shall be authoritative only for the purpose of the Agreement" (i.e. the barrier does not necessarily constitute the border). The initial barrier was completed in 1996.

Before the 2005 disengagement Israeli military maintained a one-kilometer buffer zone within Gaza along the border wall which prevented the militants to approach the border, sometimes with gunfire. After the IDF withdrawal the border became easily reachable by the Palestinians. Therefore, Israel launched the construction of the enhanced security system along the Gaza border, estimated to cost $220 million and to be completed in mid-2006.

It includes a 7-meter wall with sensors, remote-control machine guns and barbed wire in the three areas where the border runs adjacent to Israeli settlements. The land taken from the corresponding kibbutzim was compensated for, with some controversies.

Overall, the first barrier is a barbed-wire fence without sensors. The second barrier codenamed Hoovers A is 20 meters off and consist of a road and a fence with sensors. These existed before 2005. A new element is a 70-150 meter wide buffer zone codenamed Hoovers B with motion sensors in the ground and surrounded by a new sensor-equipped fence with watchtowers every 2 kilometers, equipped with remote-control machine guns instead of soldiers, which could be targets of Palestinian snipers.

The barrier is patrolled both from the air and on the ground.

== Response from Gaza ==
The barrier has met with opposition and protests from some Palestinians in Gaza.

The barrier was largely torn down by Palestinians at the beginning of the Al-Aqsa Intifada in September 2000, followed by many terror attacks. The barrier was rebuilt between December 2000 and June 2001. A one-kilometer buffer zone was added, in addition to new high technology observation posts. Soldiers were also given new rules of engagement, which, according to Ha'aretz, allow soldiers to fire at anyone seen crawling there at night illegally into Israeli territory. Palestinians attempting to cross the barrier into Israel by stealth have been shot and killed.

The barrier has been effective in preventing terrorists and suicide bombers from entering Israel from Gaza. Since 1996, virtually all suicide bombers trying to leave Gaza have detonated their charges at the barrier's crossing points and were stopped while trying to cross the barrier elsewhere. On 14 March 2004, a suicide bomber originating from within the Gaza Strip successfully carried out an attack in Ashdod, Israel.

The barrier's effectiveness prompted a shift in the tactics of Palestinian militants who commenced firing Qassam rockets and mortars over the barrier.

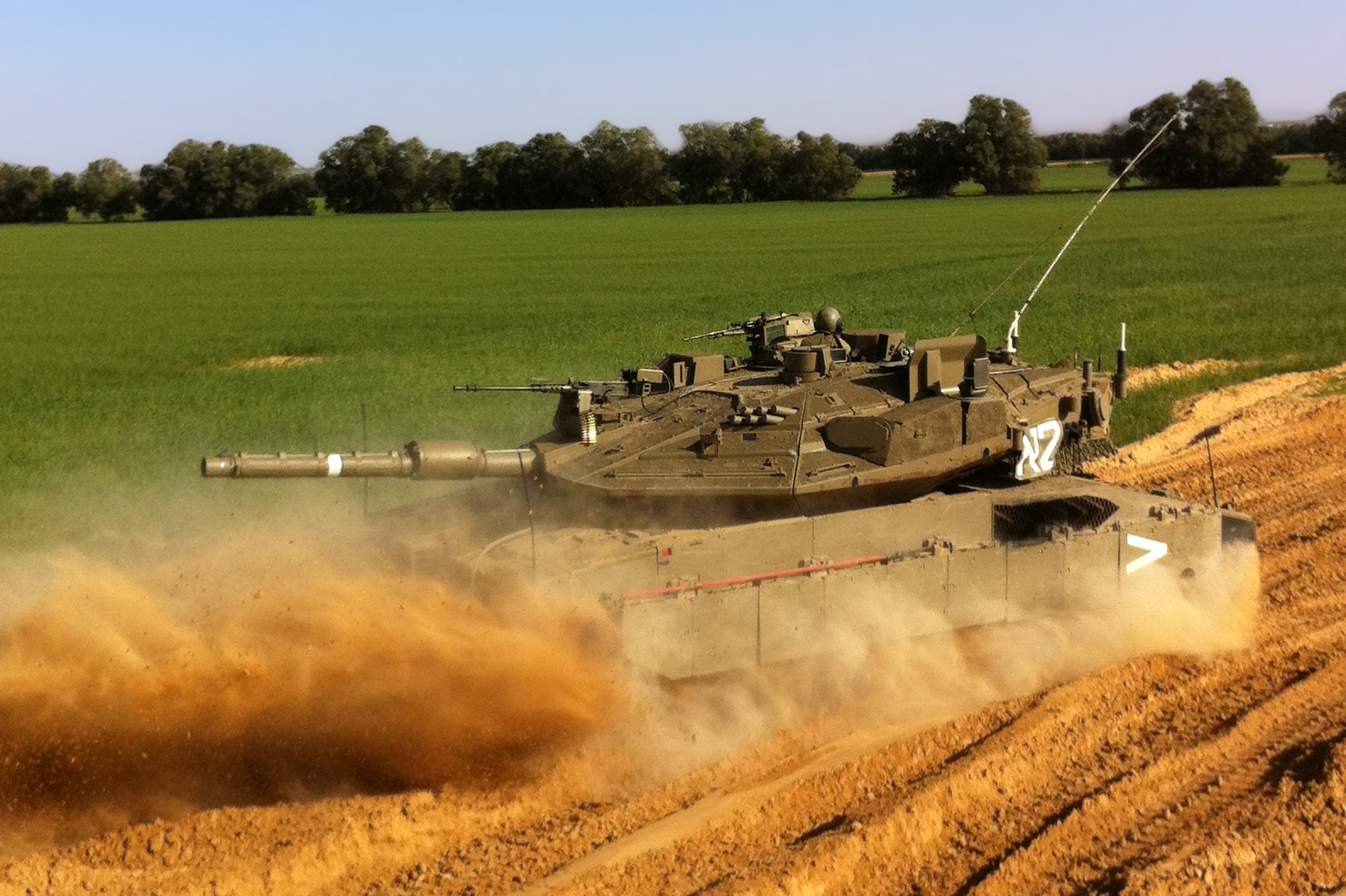
A Merkava Mark IV tank patrols the Gaza border (February 2012)

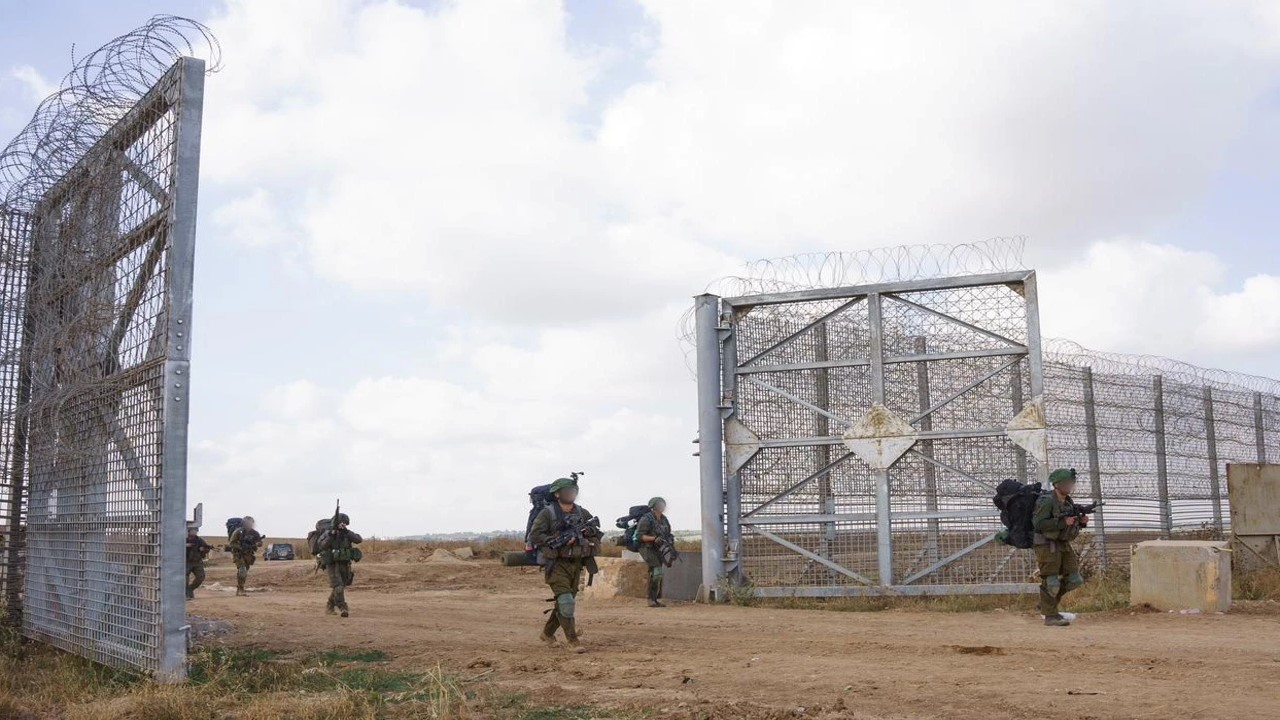
Israeli soldiers crossing the fence surrounding the Gaza Strip, Gaza War, May 2024

On 27 December 2008, Israel launched the 2008 Gaza War, consisting of airstrikes and ground incursions against targets in the Gaza Strip, with the stated aim of stopping the rocket fire from and arms smuggling into the territory. The war ended on 18 January 2009, when both sides ceased military action. Israel completed its withdrawal on 21 January, and thousands of rockets and mortars have been fired from the Gaza Strip since.

=== Support for a similar Egypt–Gaza barrier ===
Palestinian Authority President Mahmoud Abbas declared support for the Egypt–Gaza barrier, adding: "It is the Egyptians’ sovereign right in their own country. Legitimate supplies should be brought through the legal crossings", although he made no such comment towards Israel's sovereign rights. The United States announced its support for the Egypt-Gaza barrier saying it would prevent weapons smuggling. Cairo's main Al-Azhar University officially backed the government's decision for an Egypt-Gaza barrier saying that it was the "state's right to build along its walls facilities and obstacles that will enhance its security."

=== Tunnels under the barrier ===
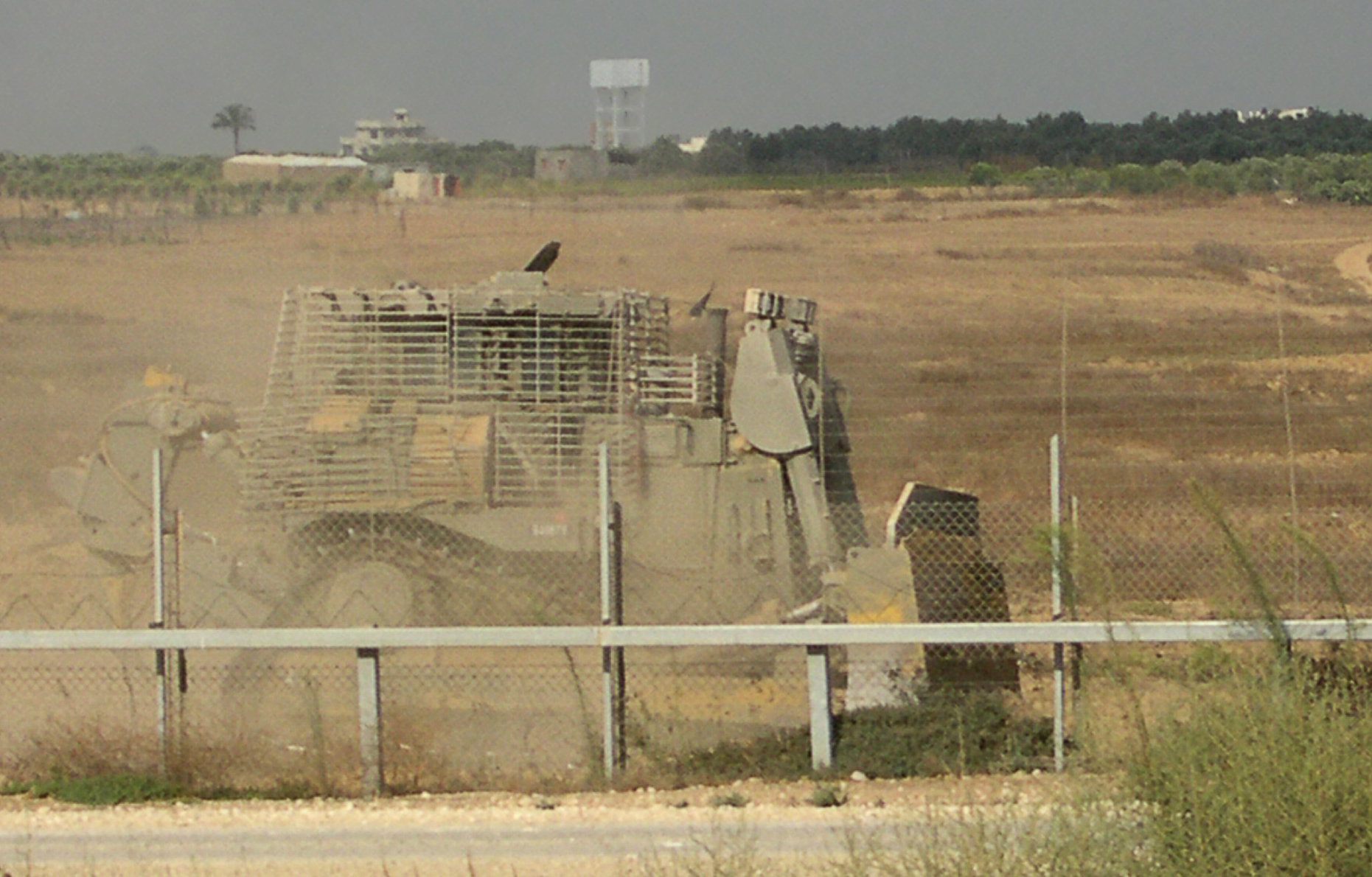
IDF Caterpillar D9R armored bulldozer working in the Palestinian side of the Israel-Gaza barrier in order to expose explosive devices

Because of the effectiveness of the barrier in stopping infiltration of Israel by militants, they adopted a strategy of digging tunnels under the barrier. On 25 June 2006, Palestinians used an 800-metre tunnel dug over a period of months to infiltrate Israel. They attacked a patrolling Israeli armored unit, killed two Israeli soldiers, and captured another one, Gilad Shalit.

Between January and October 2013, three other tunnels were identified – two of which were packed with explosives. The discovery of similarly constructed tunnels in other parts of the world have led to updated threat assessment estimates.

During the 2014 Gaza war, Israel encountered Hamas militants who popped out of tunnels into Israel and attacked soldiers along the border. After the war, Israel located and destroyed 32 tunnels. In 2018, Israel destroyed three new tunnels.

=== Underground anti-tunnel barrier ===
In response to the large number of tunnels being dug, which could be used for infiltration by militants, in mid-2017, Israel began construction of an underground border wall several meters in depth along the border. This anti-tunnel barrier along the Gaza–Israel border (sometimes referred to as the smart wall on the Israel–Gaza border) is an underground slurry wall constructed by Israel along the entire 40-kilometer (25 mi) length of the Gaza–Israel border to prevent infiltration into Israel by digging tunnels under the Gaza–Israel barrier. The project includes excavation to classified depths, and the construction of thick concrete walls combined with sensors and alarm devices.

In mid-2017, Israel began construction of the underground wall several metres in depth. The barrier is equipped with sensors that can detect tunnel construction.

The underground anti-tunnel barrier, and 81% of the barrier above the ground, was completed in March 2021. The whole project was completed in December 2021. The project had been estimated to cost 3 billion shekels ($833 million) to 3.5 billion shekels ($1.11 billion).

The wall is located entirely on Israeli land. The anti-tunnel barrier was completed in March 2021.

==== Detections ====
In October 2020, sensors in the underground structure identified a Hamas tunnel. An Israeli military official called the tunnel "The most significant tunnel we have seen to date, both in terms of depth and infrastructure".

== Crossing points ==
From the Palestinian perspective, the crossings are crucial to the economy of the Gaza Strip and to the daily needs of the population. Chief Palestinian Authority negotiator Saeb Erekat analyzed the closures of the crossings and said they have "proven to be counter-productive".

=== Israel–Gaza ===
As of 2023, there were two open border crossings with Israel, with an additional option via an Israel–Egypt crossing. During the war ensuing from the October 7 Hamas attack, two more emergency gates were eventually opened for aid convoys.

==== Kerem Shalom Crossing ====
The Kerem Shalom Crossing is the main cargo crossing, used by trucks carrying goods from Israel or Egypt to the Gaza Strip. Managed by the Israel Airports Authority.

==== Erez or Beit Hanoun Crossing ====
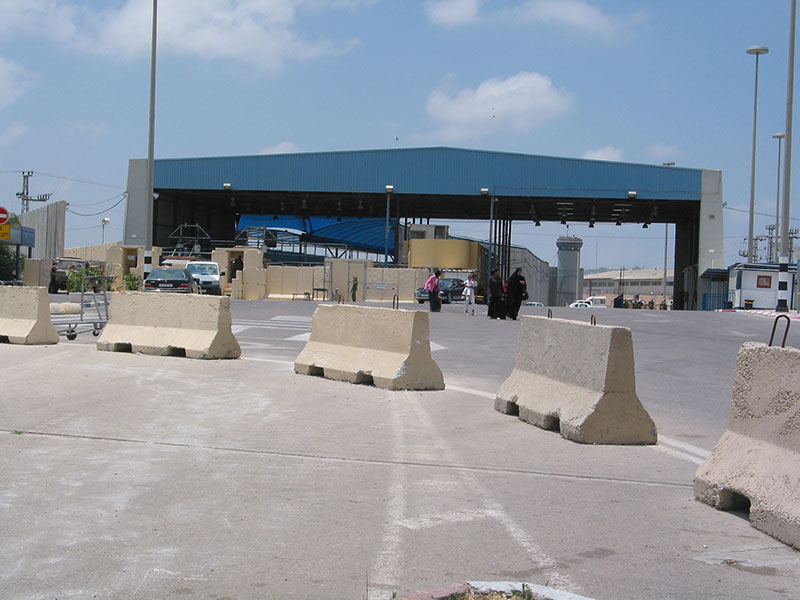
Erez Crossing

The Erez or Beit Hanoun Crossing is the only one open for people. A pedestrian and cargo crossing into Israel, it is located in northern Gaza. The crossing is currently restricted to Arab residents under the jurisdiction of the Palestinian Authority and to Egyptian nationals or international aid officials only, and is closed to tourists. Palestinians who have a permit to work in Israel or those with permits allowing them to receive free medical treatment or to visit immediate family who are in prisons may use this crossing when it is open for pedestrian travel.

Though 5,000 Palestinians are permitted to use the Erez Crossing to go to their places of work inside Israel, the crossing was frequently closed by the Israeli authorities, impeding their ability to get to work. Additionally, the permits issued have not always been honoured by soldiers, who in some cases confiscated them at the crossing.

On 7 October 2023, Erez Crossing was attacked and destroyed by Hamas. It remained closed until 1 May 2024, when it was reopened for aid transports heading into Gaza.

==== Gate 96 emergency crossing ====
On 12 March 2024, as a "pilot project", the 96th gate in the security fence (near Kibbutz Be'eri) was used by a convoy of six trucks taking humanitarian aid to northern Gaza under IDF protection. Gate 96 is slowly becoming a fixture during the war allowing aid to reach Gaza City directly, be it on a minor scale.

==== "Northern Crossing" emergency gate ====
On 12 April 2024, a newly built wartime emergency crossing for humanitarian aid was opened near Kibbutz Zikim. The content of the trucks is checked by the IDF at the Kerem Shalom border crossing facility.

==== From Israel via Egypt ====
- Nitzana Border Crossing between Israel and Egypt is an additional nearby option. It is connected by road to Sinai and the town of El Arish, which in turn connects to Gaza via the Egyptian border crossings. During the 2023 war, aid trucks entered the Strip via El Arish, Nitzana, where the contents were inspected by Israel, and into Gaza. Nitzana crossing, however, was not designed for the processing of trucks and cargo.

==== Permanently closed ====
- Karni Crossing (1994–2011)
- Sufa Crossing (1994–2008)

=== Egypt–Gaza ===
These are being used for shipments from Israel in conjunction with the Nitzana Border Crossing (see above).

- Rafah Crossing, designed primarily for pedestrians, but used during the 2023 war as the main entry for aid trucks
- Salah al-Din Gate (area plan with gate see here), since February 2018 a secondary commercial border crossing 4 km northwest of Rafah Crossing, and named after Salah al-Din Road, the Strip's main north–south thoroughfare. Before 2018, the gate allowed two-way humanitarian access for Gaza and Sinai residents, but didn't serve commercial purposes. It was repurposed in 2018, when Hamas militants manned the Gaza side and taxed incoming cargo, which included goods with controversial dual use (civilian and military), apparently without much external supervision. As of July 2023, "goods have also entered Gaza regularly from Egypt, via the Rafah crossing, controlled by the Egyptian authorities, and then through the adjacent Salah Ad Din Gate, controlled by the local authorities." Since 2018, the Salah Ad-Din Gate has seen a steady growth in traffic, so that in 2022/2023, over 50% of the construction materials, 25% of the food and c. 40% of non-food items entered the Strip through Salah Ad-Din Gate crossing. In 2023, c. 36% of the total imports to the Strip arrived through the Gate.

== See also ==
- Gaza war
- Egypt–Gaza barrier
- Israeli West Bank barrier
- 2018–2019 Gaza border protests
- Bar Lev Line
- Negev
- Palestinian tunnel warfare in the Gaza Strip
- Gaza Strip smuggling tunnels
