= Egypt–Gaza border =

International border

- The Gaza Strip

Characteristics
- Entities: Egypt, Gaza Strip
- Length: 12.6 km

History
- Established: 1949; Egyptian–Israeli General Armistice Agreement
- Current shape: 1982; Egypt–Israeli peace treaty

Egypt and the Gaza Strip share a 12-kilometre (7.5-mile) long border. There is a buffer zone along the border which is about 14 kilometres (8.7 miles) long.

The Rafah Border Crossing is the only crossing point between Egypt and the Gaza Strip. It is located on the international border that was confirmed in the 1979 Egypt–Israel peace treaty. Only passage of persons takes place through the Rafah Border Crossing; as such, the Egypt–Gaza border is only open to the passage of people, not of goods. All cargo traffic must go through Israel, usually through the Israeli-controlled Kerem Shalom border crossing on the Gaza–Israel barrier.

== Background ==
On 1 October 1906, the Ottoman and British governments agreed on a boundary between Ottoman-ruled Palestine and British-ruled Egypt, running from Taba to Rafah. Although after World War I, Mandatory Palestine was also under British control, the Egypt–Palestine boundary was maintained to control the movement of the local Bedouin. From 1948, Gaza was occupied by an independent Egypt. Consequently, the border between the Gaza Strip and Egypt proper was a mere administrative boundary without border control. In the 1967 Six-Day War, Israel conquered and occupied the Sinai Peninsula and the Gaza Strip, and again there was nominal border control.

In 1979, Israel and Egypt signed a peace treaty that returned the Sinai, which borders the Gaza Strip, to Egyptian control. As part of that treaty, a 100-meter-wide strip of land, known as the Philadelphi Route, was established as a buffer zone between the Gaza Strip and Egypt. In the peace treaty, the re-created Gaza–Egypt border was drawn across the city of Rafah. When Israel withdrew from the Sinai in 1982, Rafah was divided into Egyptian and Palestinian parts, splitting up families, separated by barbed-wire barriers.

== Buffer zone by Israel ==
Under the 1979 Egypt–Israel peace treaty, the Philadelphi Route buffer zone was a 100-meter-wide strip of land along the Gaza–Egypt border. Until 2000, the actual buffer zone was 20–40 meters wide with a 2.5 to 3 metres high concrete wall topped with barbed wire.

During the Second Intifada, which began in 2000, Israel widened the buffer zone to 200–300 meters and built a barrier wall mostly of corrugated sheet metal, with stretches of concrete topped with barbed wire. The construction of the buffer zone required the demolition of entire blocks of houses at the main entrance to Rafah's central thoroughfare.

=== 2001–2003 expansion ===
Since 2001, the IDF demolished Palestinian houses in Rafah to create the buffer zone. In 2002, hundreds of houses in Rafah were destroyed to widen the buffer zone and for the building of an eight meter high and 1.6 kilometres long metal wall along the border. The wall also extended two meters underground. The wall was built about 80–90 meters from the border, which doubled the width of the patrol corridor. After the metal wall was completed in early 2003, demolitions continued and even increased dramatically.

=== 2004 expansion, Operation Rainbow ===
After the death on 12 May 2004 of five Israeli soldiers who were operating in the buffer zone, the Israel government approved on 13 May a plan to further widen the buffer zone, which would require the demolition of hundreds of homes. The Israeli military recommended demolishing all homes within 300 meters of its positions, or about 400 meters from the border. The plan elicited strong international criticism.

On 14 May, a large IDF force entered the "Brazil block" of Rafah and in heavy fighting, as reported by unrwa, 12 Palestinians were killed and 52 injured. Israeli forces began demolishing houses in the Qishta neighbourhood and destroyed scores of houses. Around midnight the same day, the Israeli High Court of Justice issued an interim order, temporarily barring the IDF from demolishing homes in the refugee camp, if the action was not part of "a regular military operation". Nevertheless, the IDF continued the destruction of homes until 15 May 5:00 a.m. because of "immediate military necessity, a risk to soldiers, or a hindrance to a military operation", raising the number of destroyed houses to just over 100.

On 16 May, the High Court ruled that the IDF may destroy homes according to their needs; the IDF had pledged that it would refrain from unnecessarily demolishing houses. The next day, Israel started Operation Rainbow.

On 18 May, the Israel government declared that the plan to widen a buffer zone along the Egyptian border was cancelled, while the same day the army massively invaded Rafah and continued its large-scale destruction. On 19 May 2004, the United Nations Security Council condemned the killing of Palestinian civilians and the demolition of homes.

Between 1 April 2003 and 30 April 2004, 106 houses were demolished in Rafah. According to HRW, the IDF's justifications for the destruction were doubtful and rather consistent with the goal of having a wide and empty border area to facilitate long-term control over the Gaza Strip.

=== 2005 expansion ===
An army plan to dig a moat along the border was dropped in 2005 after it became clear that it would likely be rejected by Israel's Attorney General, Menachem Mazuz, because it required the destruction of 3,000 more homes in Rafah. Instead, the IDF started the building of a 7–9 meters high (about 20–30 feet) concrete wall along the border in a 60–100 meter (about 200–300 feet) wide security strip, equipped with electronic sensors and underground concrete barriers to prevent tunnelling.

== Buffer zone by Egypt ==
=== 2009 Egyptian steel wall ===
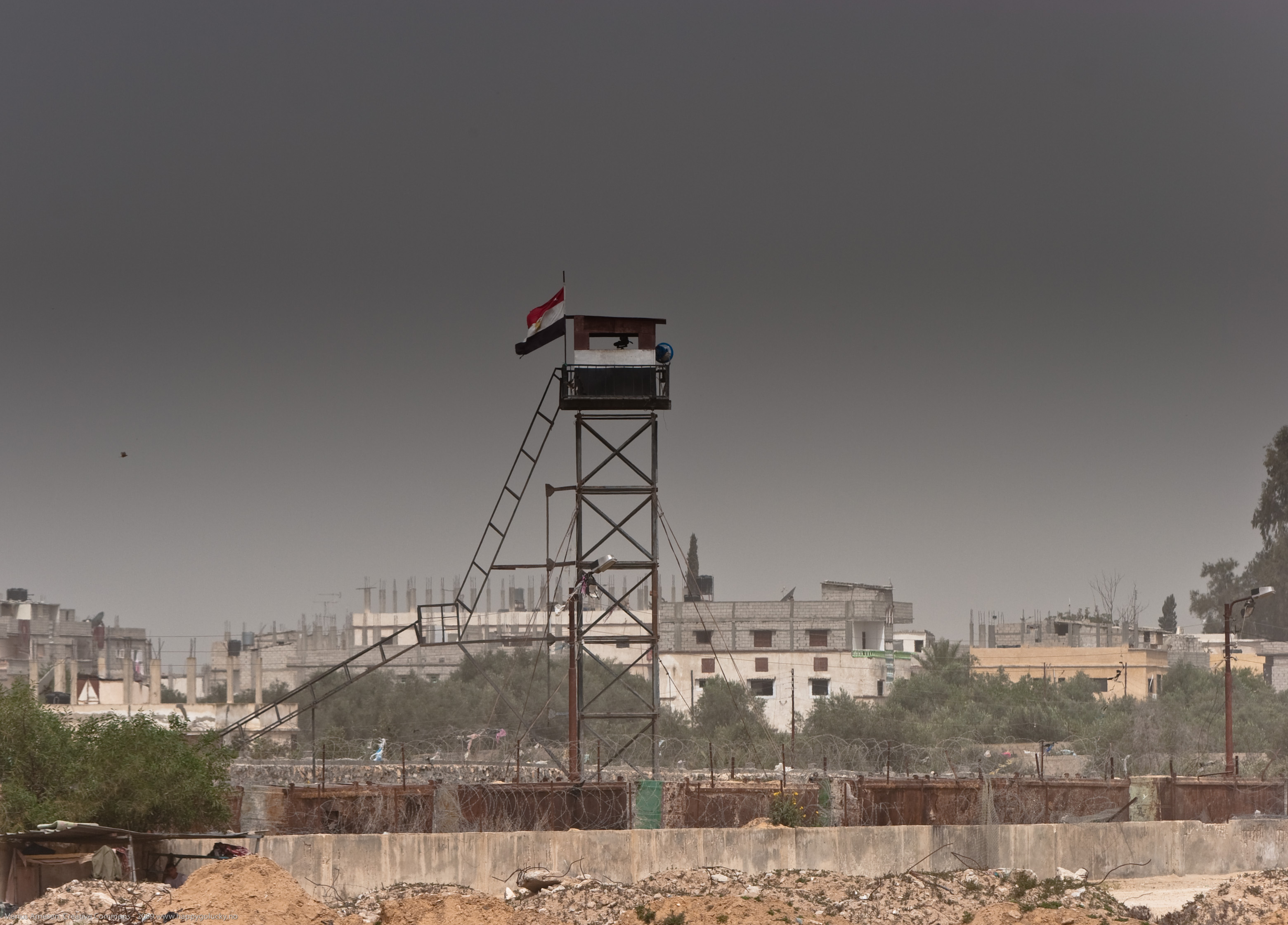
Egyptian watchtower on the border with the Gaza Strip, April 2009

In December 2009, Egypt started the building of a border barrier along the Gaza border, consisting of a steel wall that would be 10–11 km (6–7 miles) long and extend 18 m (60 feet) below the surface. The wall was planned to be completed in 18 months. The project received help from the United States and France.

Egypt reinforced the border with several hundred troops to protect construction crews from Palestinian sniper attacks.

Palestinian sources said that construction of the barrier was damaging dozens of smuggling tunnels as deep as 30 m (100 feet), causing them to collapse on a nearly daily basis and killing operators, especially tunnels near the Rafah border terminal. They added that most of the 1,500 tunnels between Gaza and Egypt remained unaffected. The sources also stated that the project has alarmed the Hamas regime in the Gaza Strip, which charges an annual $2,500 for the right to operate a tunnel.

==== Support ====
In 2010, Palestinian Authority President Mahmoud Abbas declared support for the barrier, adding: "It is the Egyptians’ sovereign right in their own country. Legitimate supplies should be brought through the legal crossings." The United States announced its support for the barrier saying it would help to prevent weapons smuggling. Cairo's main Al-Azhar University officially backed the government's decision saying that it was the "state's right to build along its walls facilities and obstacles that will enhance its security."

==== Opposition ====
Militant Islamist group Hamas, the de facto governing authority of the Gaza Strip, opposed the barrier and called it a "wall of death".

Hassan Nasrallah, chief of Lebanese militant group Hezbollah, called on Egypt to halt construction.

The Islamic Action Front, a Jordanian Islamist group, criticized Egypt for the barrier and accused it of "collaborating" with Israel and the United States. "The Egyptian authorities are ...increasing the suffering of the Palestinians in Gaza by building the steel wall and closing the border crossings with Gaza," said Hamzah Mansour, a member of the Shura Council of the Islamic Action Front.

A number of prominent Muslim clerics issued edicts against the wall, while Sheikh Yusuf Qaradawi, affiliated with the Muslim Brotherhood in Egypt, voiced his objection to the wall. In January 2010, small protests against the wall were held outside the Egyptian embassies in Jordan and Lebanon.

In a 2010 Palestinian demonstration along the border, an Egyptian border guard was shot dead and 20 Palestinians were injured from Egyptian fire.

=== 2013–2015 Egyptian demolition of homes and smuggling tunnels ===
In October 2014, Egypt announced that they planned to expand the buffer zone between Gaza and Egypt, following a terrorist attack from Gaza that killed 31 Egyptian soldiers. The buffer was created "in a move meant to halt the passage of weapons and militants through cross-border smuggling tunnels but which also puts more pressure on the Palestinian militant Hamas group."

On 29 October 2014, Egypt began demolishing homes on its side of the border with the Gaza Strip as part of a planned 500-metre (550-yard) buffer zone intended to prevent weapons smuggling into the Gaza Strip.

Egyptian authorities ordered residents living along the country's eastern border to evacuate their homes prior to their demolishing. The buffer zone was to include water-filled trenches to thwart tunnel diggers. It was to be 500 meters wide and extended along the 13 km border. Following the announcement of Ibrahim Mahlab, the Prime Minister of Egypt, that any residents unwilling to move wilfully would be forcefully removed from their homes, many residents left the area. On 17 November 2014, Egypt announced that the buffer zone would be doubled to one kilometre, due to the longer-than-expected tunnels that had been discovered.

Palestinian President Mahmoud Abbas agreed with the operation, arguing that the smuggling tunnels under the border had produced 1,800 millionaires, and were used for smuggling weapons, drugs, cash, and equipment for forging documents. Abbas had previously recommended the sealing or destruction of the tunnels, by flooding them, and then punishing the owners of the homes that contained entrances to the tunnels, by demolishing those homes.

On 8 January 2015, Egypt's expansion resulted in the destruction of about 1,220 homes, while destroying more than 1,600 tunnels. Some of the tunnels discovered were over one kilometre long, and contained lighting, ventilation, and phone systems. The total cost of this phase of the buffer zone was expected to cost $70 million. In February 2015, in response to the buffer zone, ISIS beheaded 10 men who they believed were spies for Mossad and the Egyptian Army.

In June 2015, Egypt completed its digging of a ditch at the Rafah Crossing Point, 20 meters wide by 10 meters deep. It is located two kilometres from the border with Gaza outside of Rafah City and is part of the enlarged buffer zone. Expansion of the trench along with watchtowers was planned.

On 11 September 2015, the Egyptian army began to pump water from the Mediterranean Sea into the tunnels. According to the Egyptian president Abdel Fatah Al-Sisi, flooding of the tunnels had been carried out in coordination with the Palestinian Authority. A number of Palestinian factions condemned the flooding of the border with sea water, because it posed a serious threat to environment and ground water. In November 2015, large areas of soil collapsed as a result of the flooding, threatening Gazan homes in Rafah near the Saladin Gate. Salty water flowed out from the ground, contaminating the soil and making it unusable for agriculture.

According to Human Rights Watch, between July 2013 and August 2015, Egyptian authorities demolished at least 3,255 residential, commercial, administrative, and community buildings along the border, forcibly evicting thousands of people.

In February 2020, Egypt began building a new 3-kilometre (2-mile) concrete wall along its border with the Gaza Strip, from Gaza's southeastern tip at Kerem Shalom (Karam Abu Salem) to the Rafah border crossing. The new wall is in addition to the old wall, and will not be more than 8 m (30 feet) from the old one. Both walls are within Egyptian territory. The wall will be 7 m (20 feet) high and will be equipped with electronic sensors.

In 2024, Egyptians announced that they are building a buffer zone at the Egypt–Gaza border.

== Border crossings ==
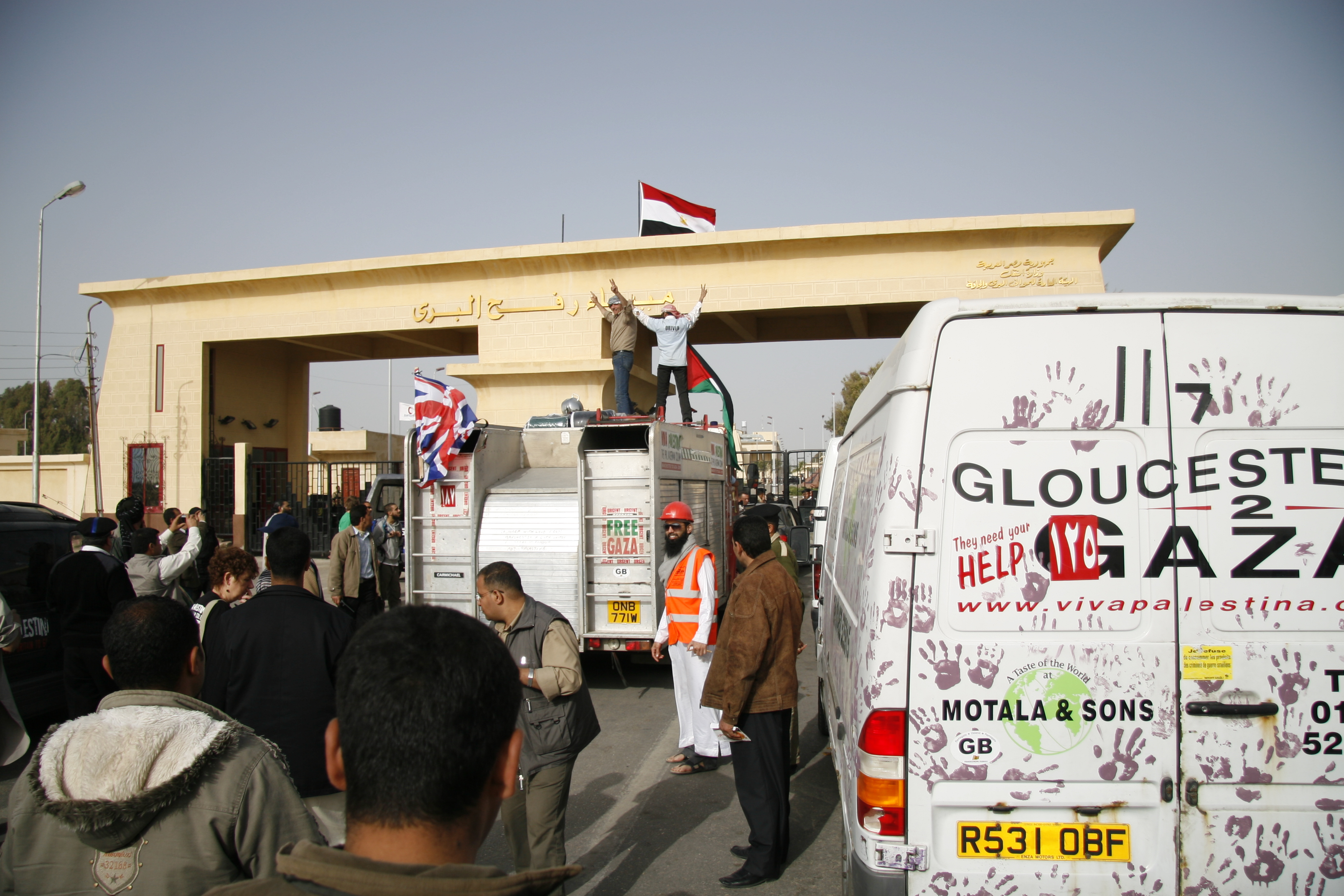
Salah al-Din Gate in Rafah

=== Rafah Crossing ===
Rafah Crossing was designed primarily for pedestrians, but used during the 2023 war as the main entry for aid trucks.

=== Salah al-Din Gate ===
Salah al-Din Gate, since February 2018 a secondary commercial border crossing 4 km northwest of Rafah Crossing, and named after Salah al-Din Road, the Strip's main north-south thoroughfare. Before 2018, the gate allowed two-way humanitarian access for Gaza and Sinai residents, but didn't serve commercial purposes. It was repurposed in 2018, when Hamas militants manned the Gaza side and taxed incoming cargo, which included goods with controversial dual use (civilian and military), apparently without much external supervision. As of July 2023, "goods have also entered Gaza regularly from Egypt, via the Rafah crossing, controlled by the Egyptian authorities, and then through the adjacent Salah Ad Din Gate, controlled by the local authorities." Since 2018, the Salah Ad-Din Gate has seen a steady growth in traffic, so that in 2022/2023, over 50% of the construction materials, 25% of the food and c. 40% of non-food items entered the Strip through Salah Ad-Din Gate crossing. In 2023, c. 36% of the total imports to the Strip arrived through the Gate.

== Smuggling tunnels ==
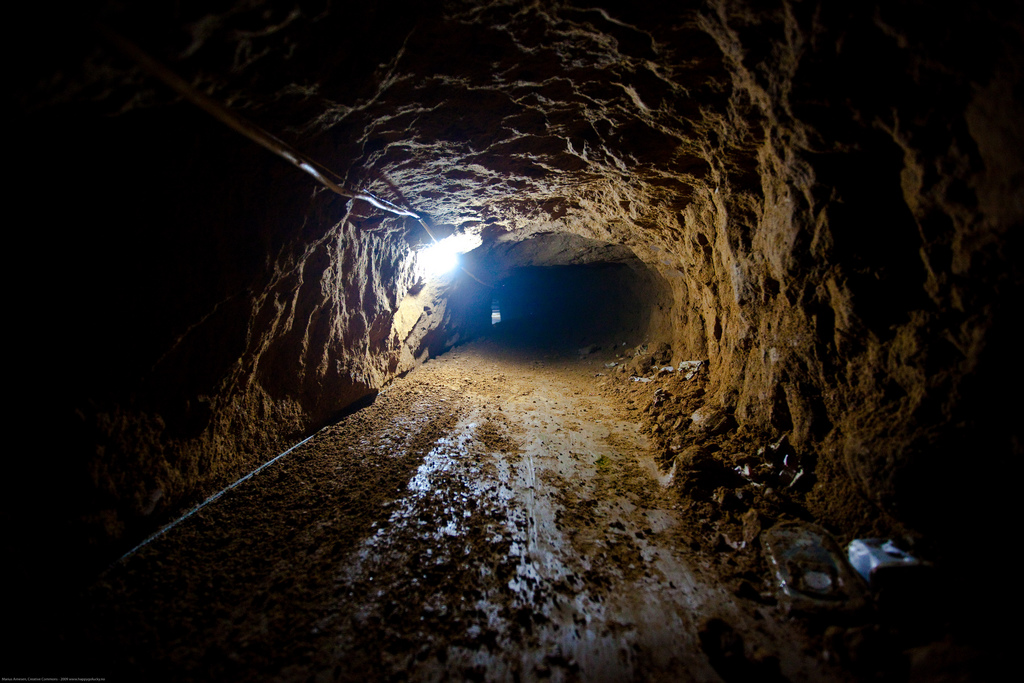
Smuggling tunnel in Rafah, 2009.

In January 2008, Palestinian militants breached several parts of the wall bordering the town of Rafah. Thousands of Gazans flowed into Egypt in search of food and supplies.

According to analysts at a January 2010 Egyptian security conference, the barrier reflects Egypt's concern that al-Qaeda-inspired militants from the Gaza Strip will infiltrate Egypt after being forced out by Hamas, the de facto governing authority in the Strip, which Egypt considers a terrorist group, along with Israel, the EU, USA and others. The analysts said Egypt could become a haven and a battleground for small Salafist militant groups such as Jund Ansar Allah, Army of Islam and Jaljalat, which have been squashed by Hamas since it took control in 2007. The barrier has proved to be of little effect, with it being "breached hundreds of times" according to an Egyptian security official.

After the fall of the Mubarak regime in 2011, Egypt relaxed restrictions at its border with the Gaza Strip, allowing more Palestinians to cross freely for the first time in four years. The Egyptian army continued to destroy Gaza Strip smuggling tunnels, according to the Egyptian army "in order to fight any element of terrorism". As of April 2013, Egypt reinforced its troops on the border with the Gaza Strip.

By September 2021, Egypt had destroyed more than 3,000 smuggling tunnels over six years by flooding them or by pumping in toxic gas, at times resulting in deaths.

== See also ==
- Israel–Gaza barrier
- Kerem Shalom border crossing
- Philadelphi Corridor
- Egypt–Israel barrier
- Israeli West Bank barrier
