= Palestinian freedom of movement =

Movement restrictions in the West Bank

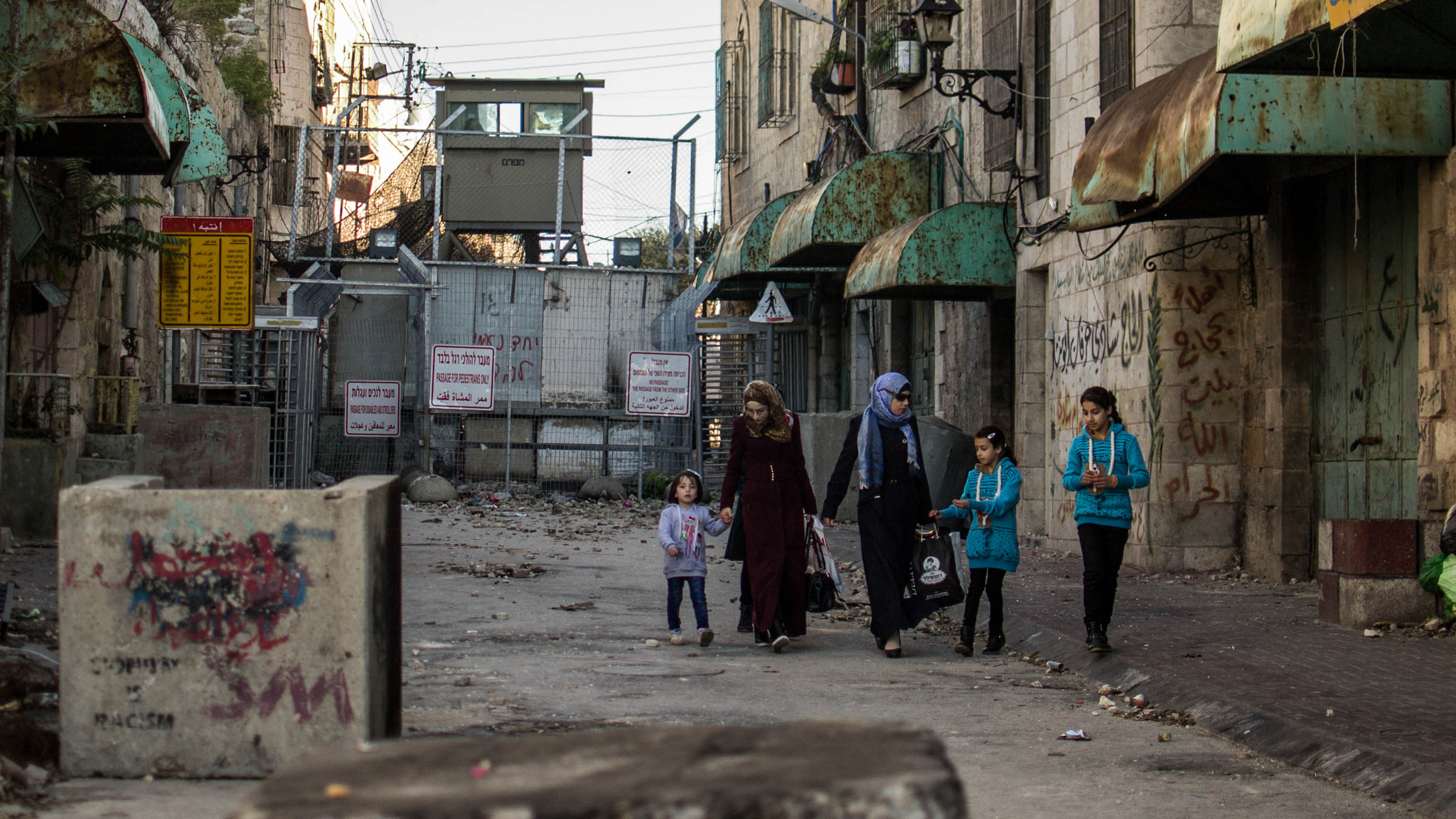
Al-Shuhada Street, Palestinian side of Tarpat Israeli checkpoint in Hebron, in the occupied West Bank, Nov 2015

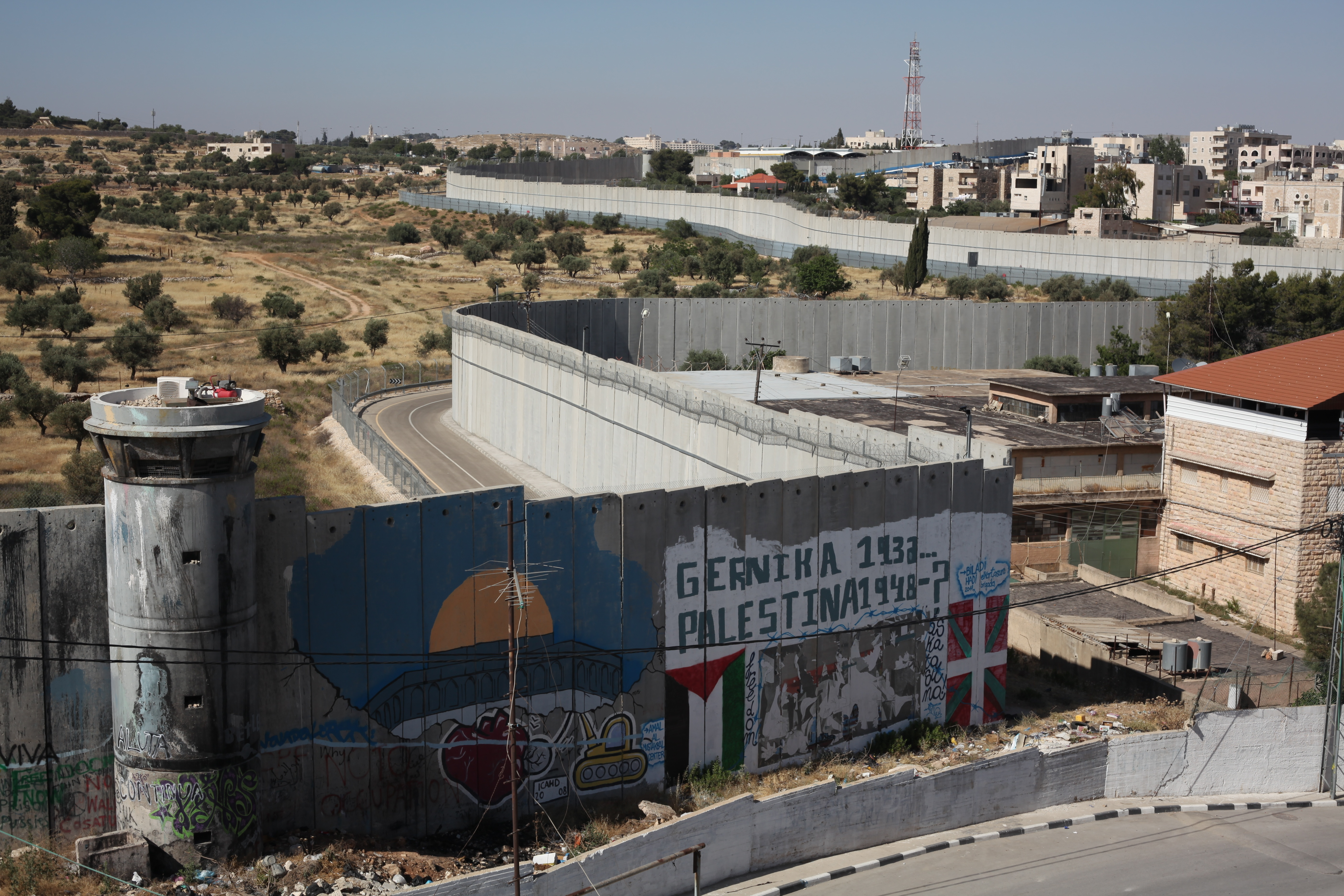
The Israeli separation wall in the occupied West Bank, June 2011

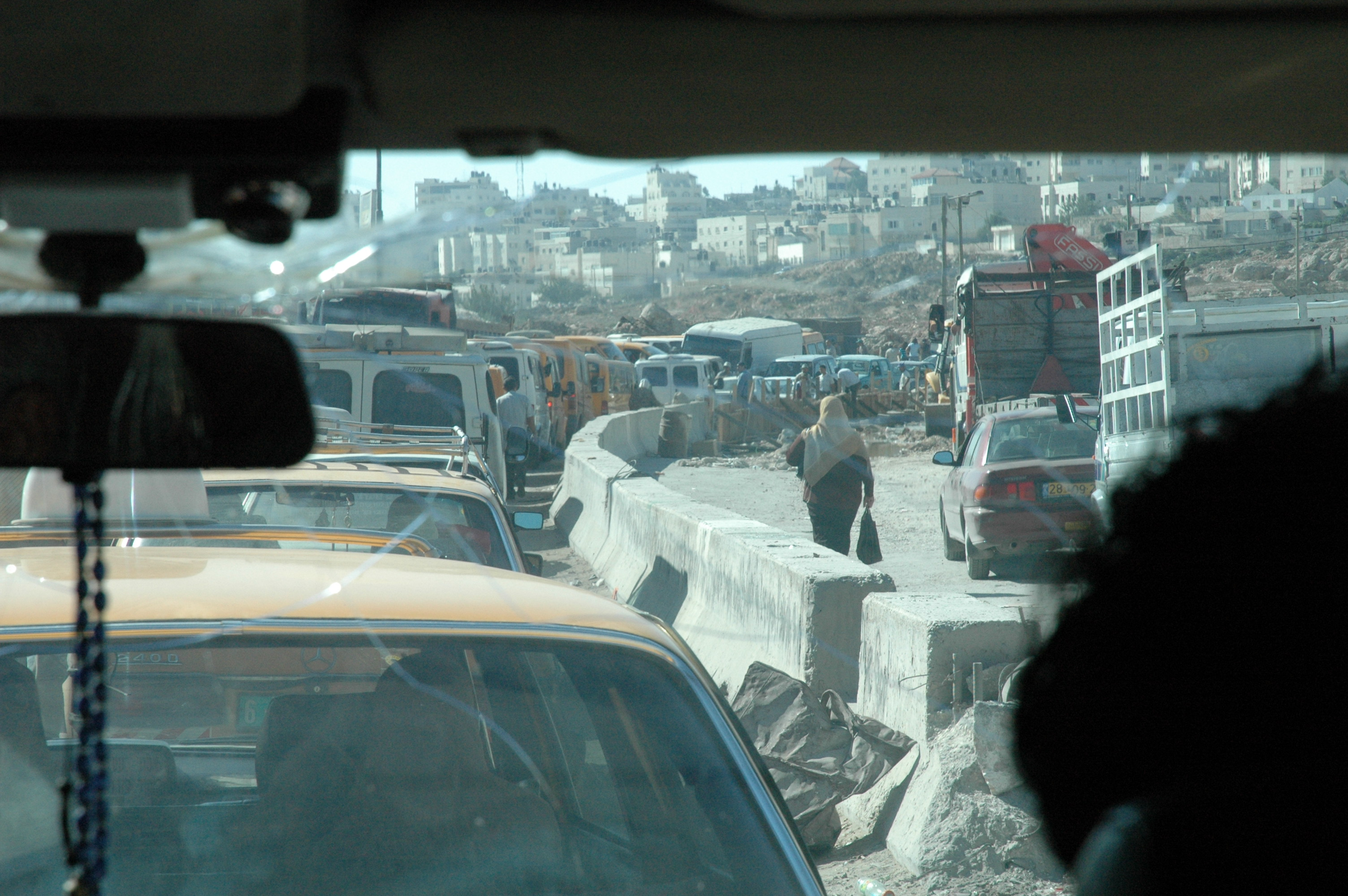
Qalandia refugee camp checkpoint, August 2004

Restrictions on the movement of Palestinians in the Israeli-occupied territories by Israel are an issue in the Israeli–Palestinian conflict. Following the 1967 war, the occupied territories were proclaimed closed military zones. In 1972, general exit orders were issued allowing residents of those territories to move freely between the West Bank, Israel and the Gaza Strip. Following the First Intifada by 1991, the general exit orders were revoked, and personal exit permits were required. According to B'Tselem, a measure of overall closure of the territories was enacted for the first time in 1993, and would result in total closures following rises in Palestinian political violence.

In the mid-1990s, with the signing of the Oslo Accords and the division of the West Bank and the Gaza Strip into three separate administrative divisions, there was little change to these restrictions. Comprehensive closures following the outbreak of the Second Intifada resulted in a few months of almost complete prohibition on Palestinian movement into Israel and between the West Bank and Gaza Strip. Israel then allowed limited travel by Palestinians into Israel for medical treatment, trade, and other needs, and a limited number of workers were allowed to work in Israel. This situation was still in place as of 2010. Israel occasionally still places comprehensive closures and cancels permits following acts of violence by Palestinians and during Israeli holidays. Israel says that the restrictions are necessary to protect Israelis living in Israel and Israeli settlements.

Israel enforces restrictions on the freedom of movement of Palestinians in the West Bank by employing a system of permanent, temporary and random manned checkpoints, the West Bank barrier and by forbidding the usage of roads by Palestinians. A 2007 World Bank report concluded that the West Bank "is experiencing severe and expanding restrictions on movement and access, high levels of unpredictability and a struggling economy". Unmanned physical obstructions to block roads and paths might include dirt piles, concrete blocks, large stones, barriers, ditches, and metal gates. The physical obstructions might be altered often, on the basis of political and security circumstances.

== Background ==
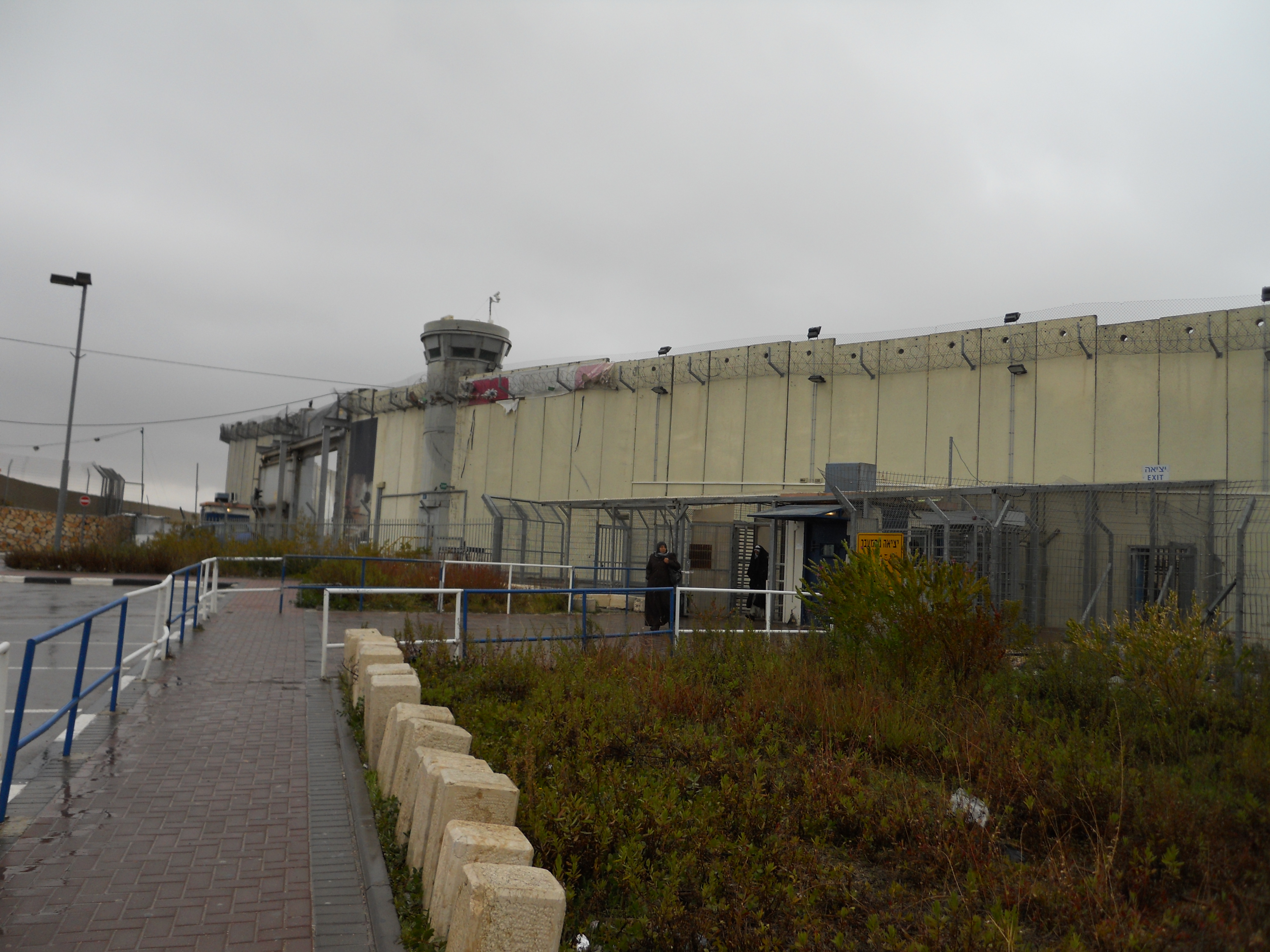
Entry point of the Israeli separation wall surrounding Bethlehem, January 2012.

The ongoing Israeli occupation of the Palestinian Territories and expansion of Israeli settlements, until 2005 also in Gaza, furthered hostilities between Palestinians and Israelis. During the Second Intifada in 2000, in response to Palestinian attacks on both Israeli soldiers and civilians, Israel tightened the borders. A comprehensive system of restrictions on the freedom of movement of Palestinians within the West Bank was developed. This system consists of physical obstacles (checkpoints, roadblocks, the West Bank barrier), and administrative restrictions (prohibited roads, permit requirements, age restrictions. Since Hamas' takeover of Gaza in 2007, Israel has imposed a complete blockade of the Gaza Strip, restricting imports and fishing areas, and the movement of goods and people between West Bank and Gaza.

The systematic restriction on the freedom of movement of Palestinians is also known as the Israeli "closure policy", or the "policy of separation between the Gaza Strip and the West Bank". The closure policy is imposed on the Palestinian population as a collective measure. It affects movement within parts of the OPT, between West Bank and Gaza, between the OPT and Israel as well as between the OPT and the rest of the world. While Israel directly controls the borders between Israel and the OPT, it controls the borders with Egypt and Jordan indirectly through provisions in the Agreement on Movement and Access (AMA) and the Israel–Jordan peace treaty respectively.

== History ==
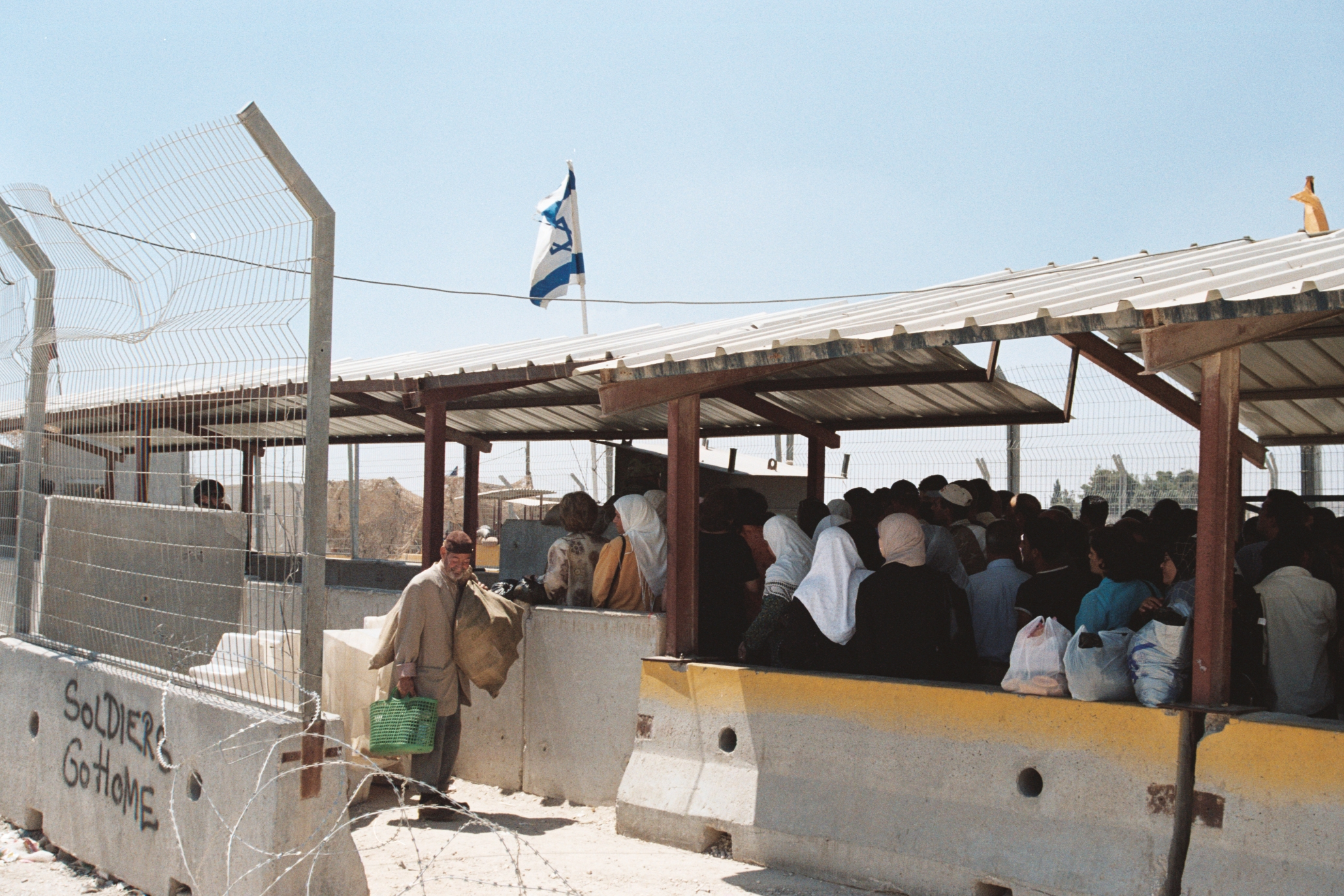
Kalandia checkpoint between Jerusalem and Ramallah is known as a frequent flash point between Palestinian protesters and Israeli security forces.

Subsequent to the 1967 Six-Day War, Israel's military proclaimed the West Bank and Gaza Strip to be closed military areas by Military Order No. 1. In 1972, general exit orders were issued allowing residents of the West Bank and Gaza Strip to freely leave, and travel between the Gaza Strip and the West Bank. Palestinians were also allowed to travel to Israel, which included East Jerusalem following its annexation by Israel. Palestinians were not allowed to be in Israel between 1.00 and 5.00 a.m. These exit orders were restricted for the first time in June 1989, shortly after the start of the First Intifada. Israel set up a magnetic card system and only those with such a card were allowed to enter Israel from the Gaza Strip. Magnetic cards were not issued to released prisoners, former administrative detainees, or people who had been detained and released without charges being filed against them.

In 1991, during the Gulf War, general exit orders were revoked and a new policy requiring each resident to obtain a personal exit permit to enter Israel. At first, most Palestinians could continue to enter Israel routinely since Israel issued many permits for relatively long periods. Gradually, however, Israel's permit policy became more and more strict. Under the permanent closure policy, residents of Gaza required a personal exit permit to travel within Israel or the West Bank.

In March 1993, Israel imposed an overall closure on the Gaza Strip with newly built checkpoints. The overall closure policy was imposed following the killing of nine Israeli civilians and six security forces personnel by Palestinian residents of the Palestinian territories. Israel claimed the closures provide security for Israelis and curtail Palestinian political violence. Amal Jamal, professor of political science at Tel Aviv University says that the policy was used as "a political weapon to force Palestinians into accepting short-term economic improvements over long-term territorial and political solutions".

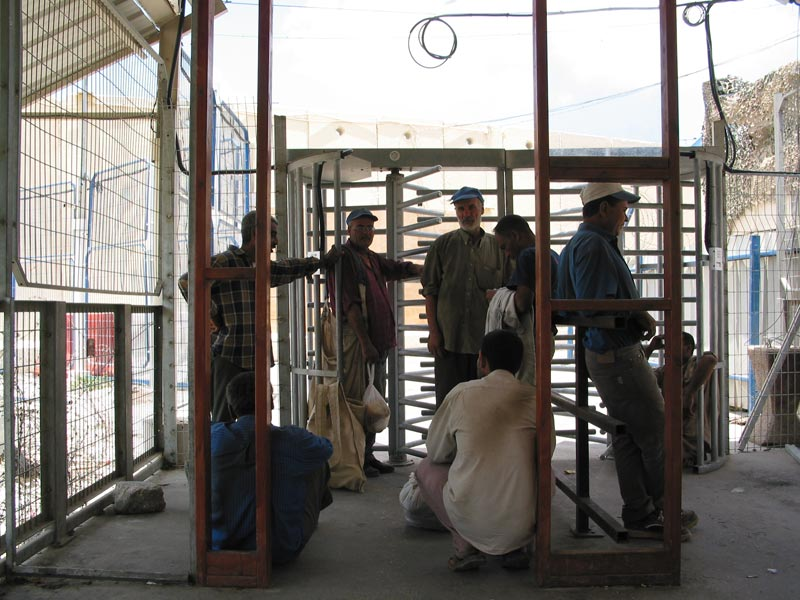
Palestinian workers waiting at the Erez border crossing to be allowed to return to the Gaza Strip, July 25, 2005

In September 2000, the start of the Second Intifada triggered Israeli closures and restrictions on the movement of Palestinians. From October 2000, Israel imposed a comprehensive closure of the Gaza Strip. In 2005, Israelis of the Gush Katif Israeli settlements were evacuated as part of Israel's unilateral disengagement plan, and all Israeli restrictions on internal movements ceased. In 2007, Hamas took over the Gaza Strip, after which Israel and Egypt imposed a blockade of the Gaza Strip and largely closed its borders. Israel further tightened the blockade after Hamas began firing rockets into Israel. The blockade restricts the movement of people into Israel and to other parts of the Palestinian territories. According to B'tselem, Israel's current restrictions on Palestinian movement, implemented since the beginning of the Second Intifada, are the strictest so far implemented by Israel.

=== Dual citizens ===
==== United States ====
International airports in Israel had been largely closed to Palestinian Americans (there are not presently any operational airports in Palestine) until 2023 when Israel signed a Memorandum of Understanding with the United States which would "extend reciprocal privileges to all U.S. citizens and nationals traveling to or through Israel" and commit that they "receive equal treatment without regard to race, religion, or national origin" "including Palestinian Americans on the Palestinian population registry".

== Restriction of movement in the West Bank ==
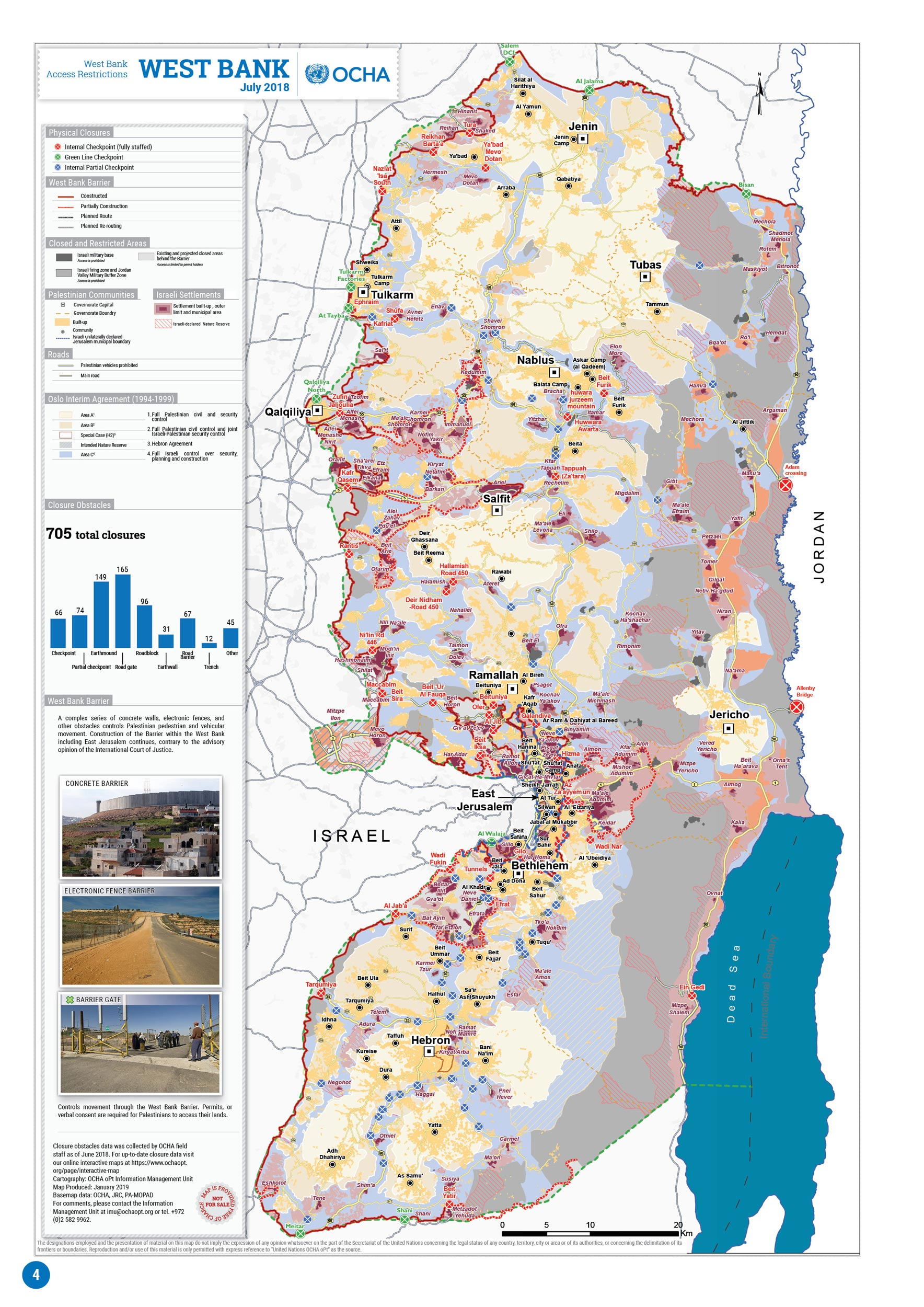
Map of access restrictions in the occupied West Bank, 2018

Israeli rights group B'Tselem called the checkpoints and physical roadblocks set up in the West Bank illegal and a collective punishment. According to B'Tselem, the original purpose of response to "specific security threats" has also become to facilitate the safe passage of settlers on roads that are restricted to Palestinians. Many of the restrictions violate the principle of proportionality and therefore are illegal. The roadblocks split the West Bank into six hardly-connected sections, and make it complicated for Palestinians to reach medical services, travel to work, transport goods and visit relatives. The Israeli Ministry of Justice said in reaction that the roadblocks were put in place to protect Israeli citizens after a long range of suicide and shooting attacks by Palestinian militants, and have prevented hundreds of such attacks.

=== Roadblocks and earthmounds ===
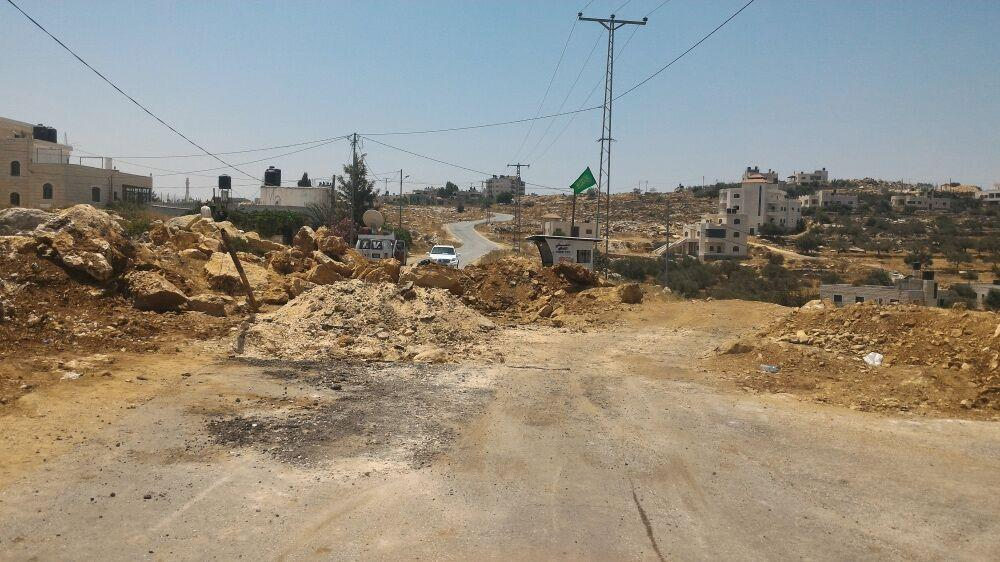
Earthmounds placed by the Israeli army to punish the village of Kobar, north of Ramallah, July 2017

Roadblocks and earthmounds are objects to block traffic, typically used to channel Palestinian traffic into the Israeli checkpoints. Roadblocks are series of about one cubic meter concrete blocks; earthmounds are mounds of rubble, dirt and/or rocks. Alternatively, trenches are used to control the movement of vehicles or metal road gates to block access.

=== Checkpoints ===
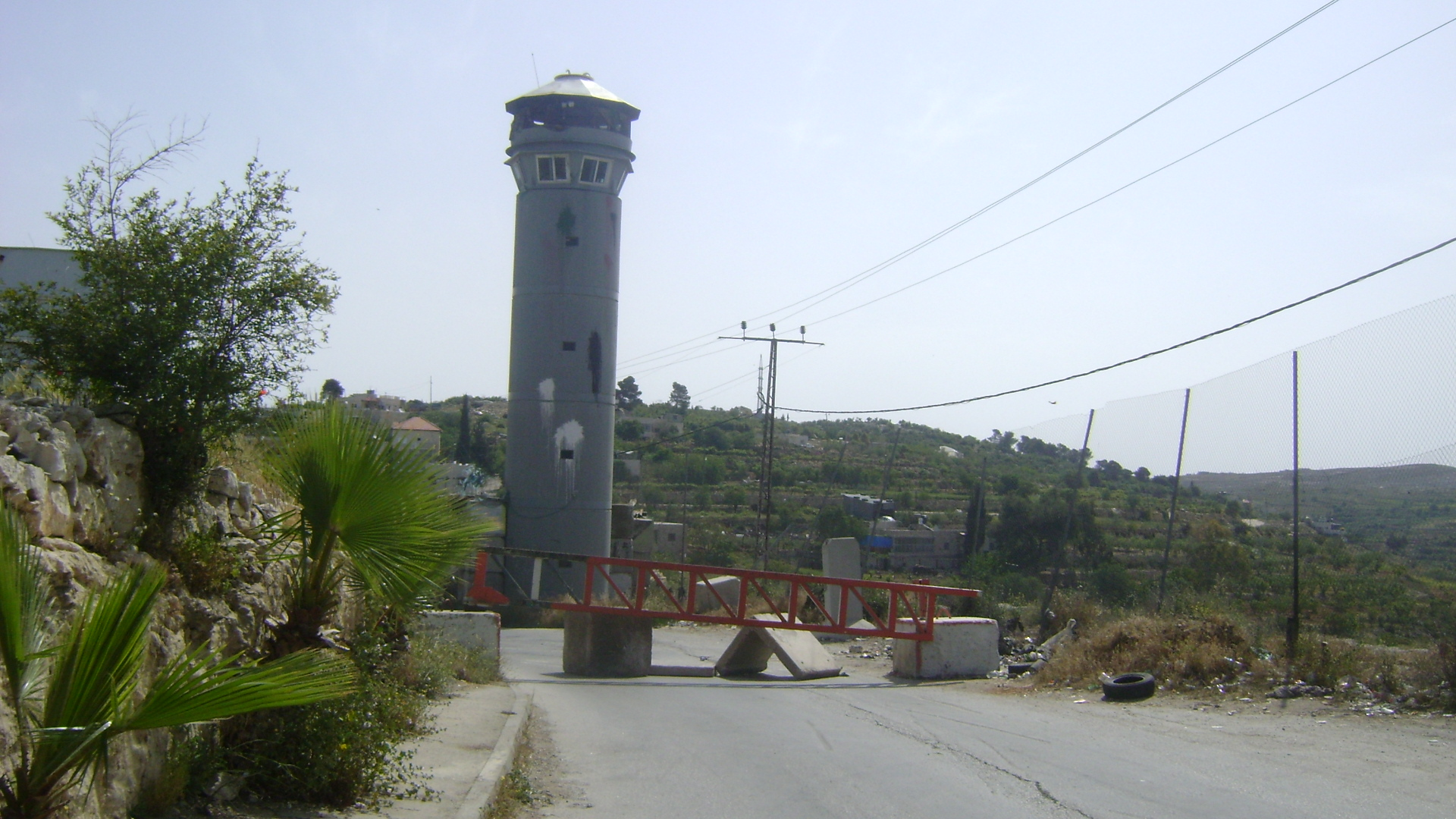
Roadblock at Beit Ummar, 2010

According to B'Tselem, there were 99 fixed checkpoints in the West Bank in September 2013, in addition to 174 surprise flying checkpoints. In August 2013, 288 flying checkpoints were counted. At the close of 2012, OCHA counted on average approximately 532 physical obstructions a month, including roadblocks, earthmounds, earth walls, road gates, road barriers, and trenches.

==== Checkpoints inside the West Bank ====
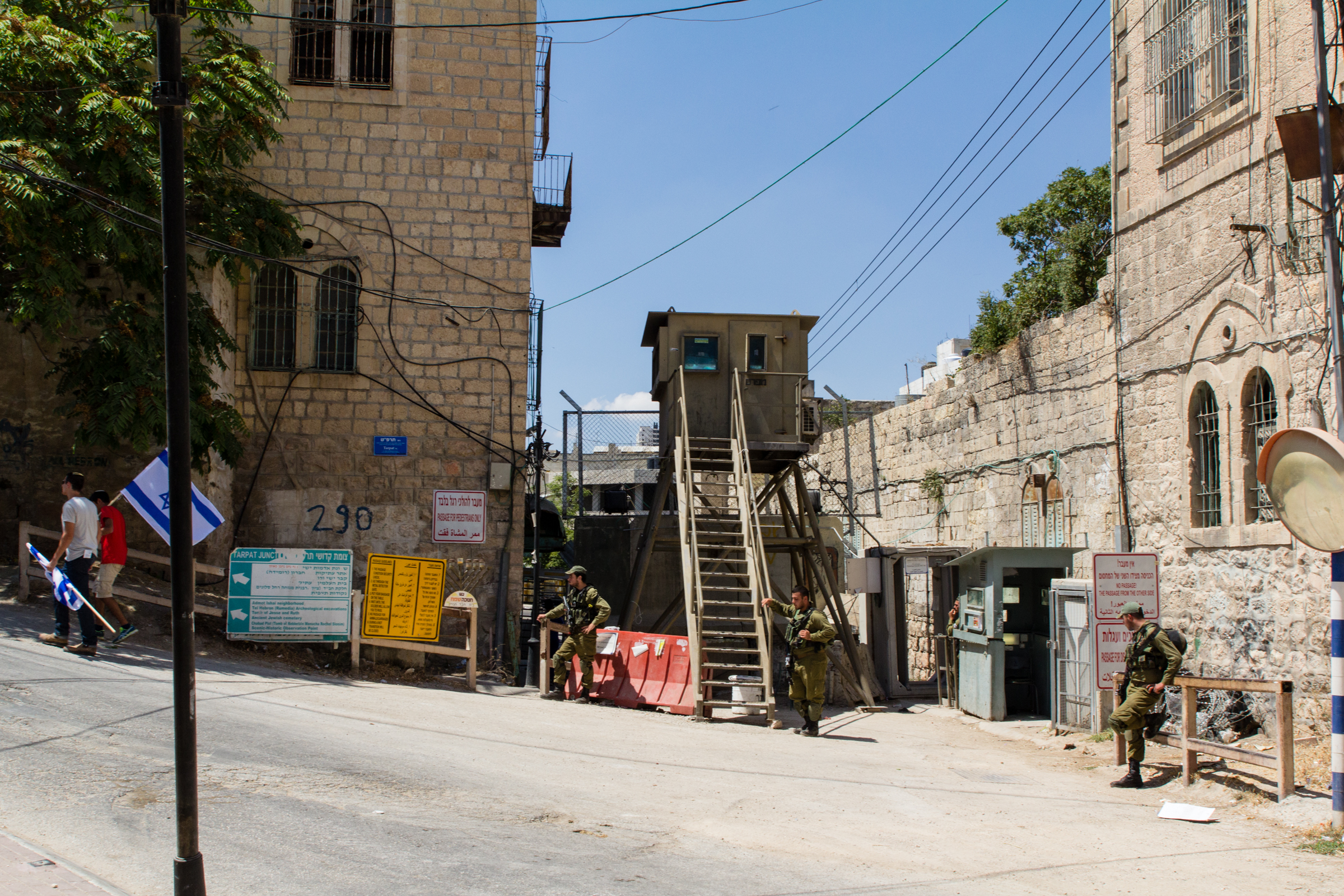
Al-Shuhada Street in Hebron, nicknamed the "apartheid street", blocked by an Israeli military checkpoint, August 28, 2015

Most of the checkpoints are used by Israel to control the internal movements of Palestinians with the stated aim of enhancing the security of Israelis and preventing those who wish to do harm from crossing. As of 31 August 2009, according to B'Tselem, the Israeli army had 60 permanent checkpoints inside the West Bank, 18 of them in the city of Hebron. According to B'Tselem, 28 are regularly staffed – some around the clock, some only during the day, and some only a few hours a day. According to B'Tselem, permanent checkpoints form the most severe restriction on movement of Palestinians, who are subjected to checks that often cause prolonged delays and at some checkpoints, soldiers ban every Palestinian from going through except those who carry special permits.

Many checkpoints only allow the passage of Palestinians who meet certain gender and age-based criteria. Figures from the UN Office for the Coordination of Humanitarian Affairs (OCHA), state that there has been an average of 65 random checkpoints in the West Bank each week between September 2008 and the end of March 2009.

==== Checkpoints between Israel and West Bank ====
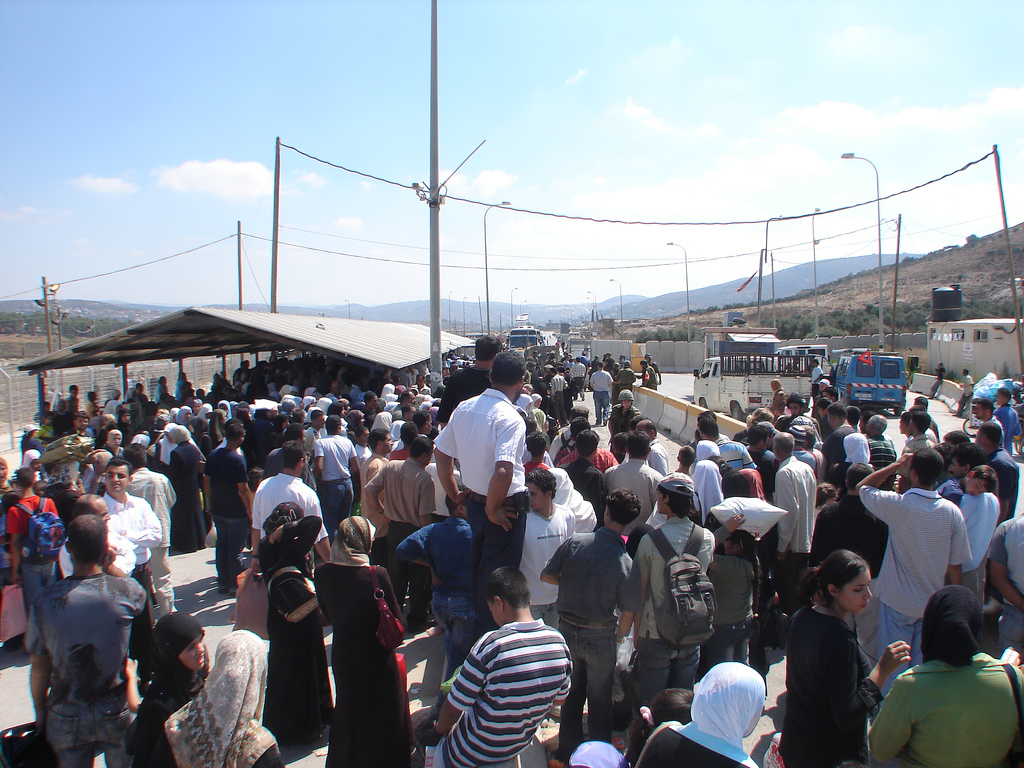
Huwwara checkpoint, south of Nablus.

There are 39 of these checkpoints that are permanent, manned and operate 24 hours a day and serve as the last control points between the West Bank and Israel. Although only land within the Green Line is administered as part of the State of Israel, according to B'tselem, most of these checkpoints are positioned within the West Bank, often kilometers from the Green Line.

There are 63 gates in the West Bank barrier, of which half are available for Palestinian use; however, Palestinians are required to have a permit to cross. According to B'tselem, the gates for Palestinians are open for a few hours each day.

==== Misbehavior of personnel manning checkpoints ====
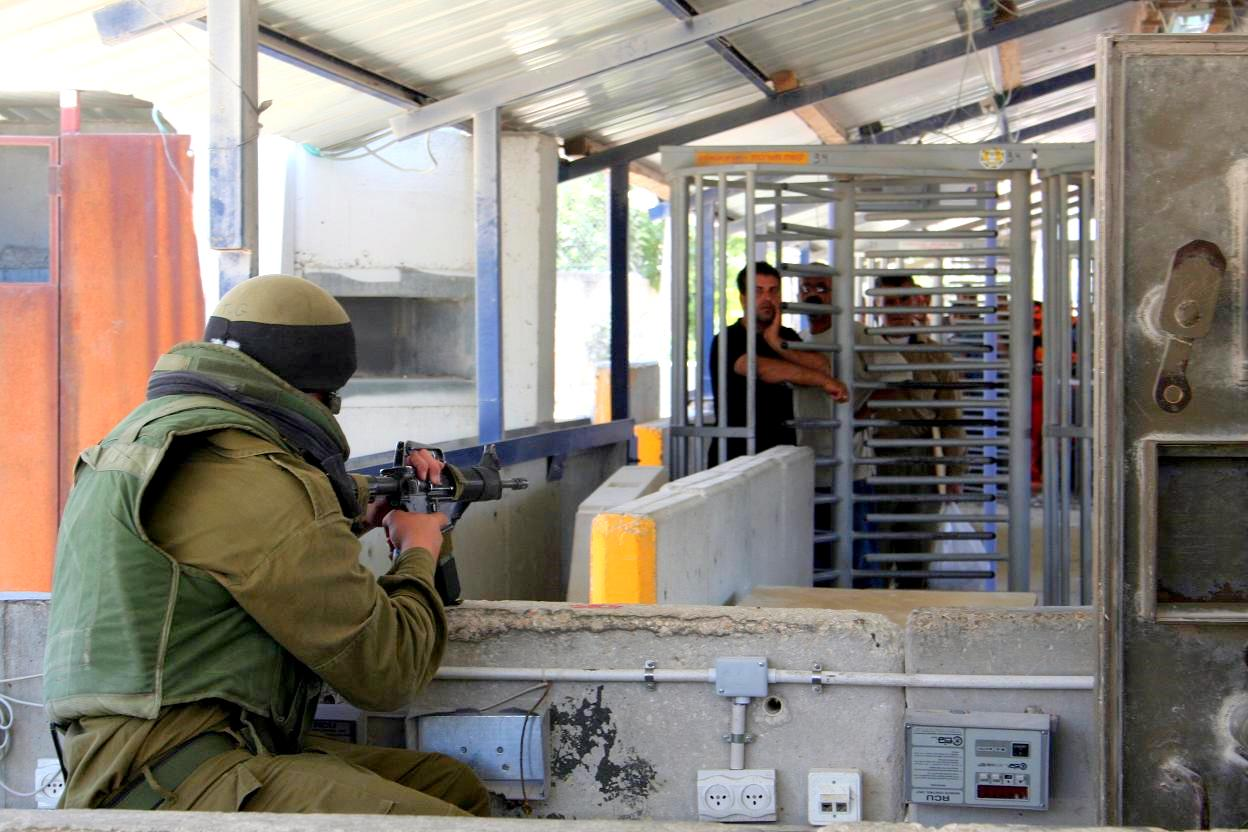

The Israel Defense Forces' Military Advocate General, Maj. Gen. Dr. Menachem Finkelstein released a statement to the Knesset Constitution, Justice and Law Committee in which he reported that there were many complaints about the troops manning the checkpoints abusing and humiliating Palestinians. He said that the excessive number of complaints "lit a red light". He said that the number of complaints required an examination to see whether the misbehavior was being caused by an excessive workload of the IDF soldiers manning the checkpoints.

An Israeli soldier was removed from duty and imprisoned for two weeks for refusing the passage of a pregnant Palestinian woman in labour. The woman was forced to give birth at the checkpoint and she suffered a miscarriage.

=== Ease of restrictions ===
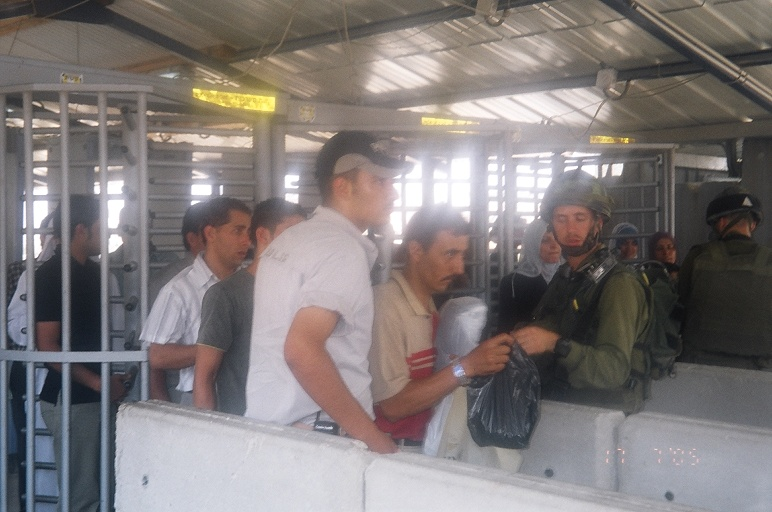
Huwwara checkpoint, July 2005

Occasionally, ease of restrictions was announced. The IDF has stated that during 2008, it had removed the crossing joins, 140 roadblocks and eight central checkpoints "in an effort to improve freedom of movement for the civilian Palestinian population in Judea, Samaria and the Jordan Valley". As of July 2009, Israeli authorities reported that an additional 27 checkpoints and 140 roadblocks had been removed. Indeed, between April 2009 and the end of March 2010, the IDF implemented a series of measures that improved the freedom of movement, including the removal of obstacles. However, no significant improvement took place in the access to areas behind the Barrier. Due to differing definitions, the IDF counts less obstacles than OCHA.

=== Splitting of the West Bank ===
According to B'Tselem, the West Bank has been split into six distinct localities by Israel's restrictions—North, Center, South, the Jordan Valley, the northern Dead Sea, the enclaves created by the West Bank barrier and East Jerusalem. Travelling between these regions is difficult and an exceptional occurrence, requiring a justification for officials, a great deal of time and sometimes substantial expense. According to a 2007 World Bank report titled "Movement and Access Restriction in the West Bank", "In the West Bank, closure is implemented through an agglomeration of policies, practices and physical impediments which have fragmented the territory into ever smaller and more disconnected cantons."

According to Said Zeedani, Israeli checkpoints impede the travel of Palestinians between the West Bank, the Gaza Strip, East Jerusalem, from Gaza and the outside world. "They make it extremely difficult for Palestinians even to move from one city to another and from one village to another within the same area or region".

=== West Bank barrier and Seam Zone ===
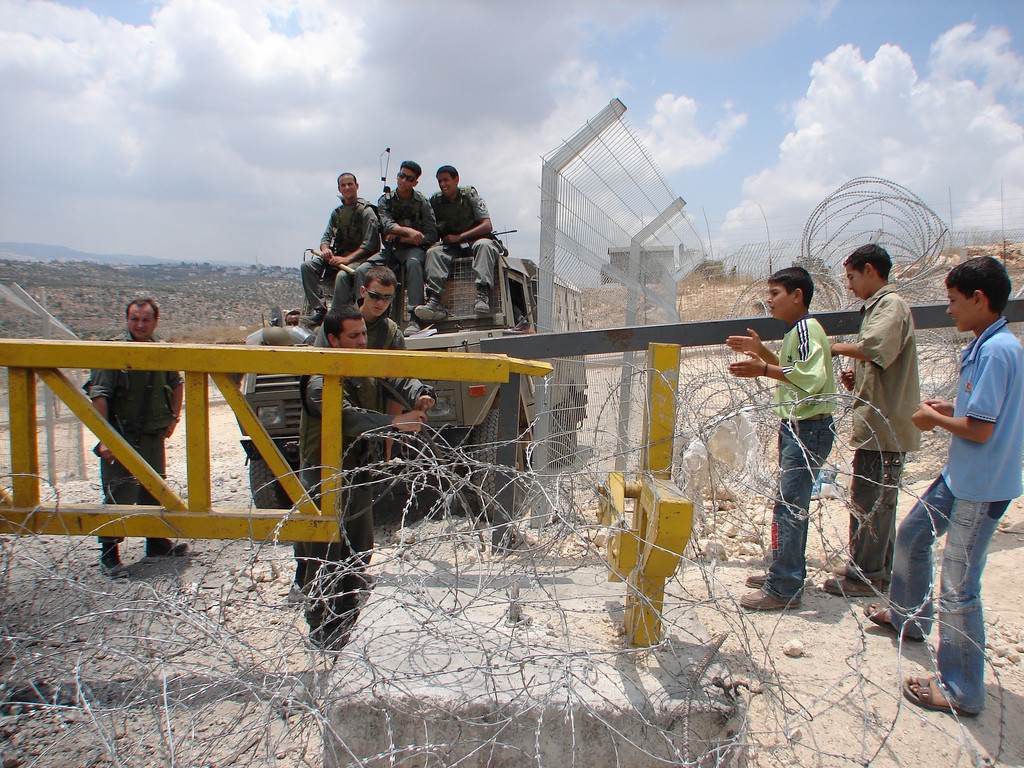
Demonstration by Palestinian children at a gate of the Israeli separation barrier in Bil'in, in the occupied West Bank, July 2006. This gate is the only way for villagers to access their agricultural land

The Israeli West Bank barrier is the single largest obstacle to Palestinian movement. The zone between the barrier and the Green Line is known as the Seam Zone. There are many olive groves in the seam zone and even though Israel opened "seasonal gates" in the barrier and issued permits to farmers, olive production has been hindered by the lack of access granted to Palestinian farmers throughout the year.

A UN report released in August 2005 observed that the existence of the barrier "replaced the need for closures: movement within the northern West Bank, for example, is less restrictive where the Barrier has been constructed. Physical obstacles have also been removed in Ramallah and Jerusalem governorates where the Barrier is under construction." The report notes that more freedom of movement in rural areas may ease Palestinian access to hospitals and schools, but also notes that restrictions on movement between urban population centers have not significantly changed.

=== Closure of the West Bank ===
During closures, all travels permits issued to residents of the West Bank to travel over the Green Line are frozen, whether they are for purposes of work, trade or medical treatment. In 2006 there were 78 closure days. In 2005 there were 132. Such closures of the West Bank are common during Jewish religious holidays.

Protests have occurred at a checkpoint on the route from the Christian holy site of Bethlehem to Jerusalem. Christian Palestinians have complained that they wanted to attend church in Jerusalem to celebrate the Christian holy day of Palm Sunday but they have been prevented by the Israeli security regime. Christian protesters have been joined by Muslims and secular Palestinians.

=== Forbidden roads ===
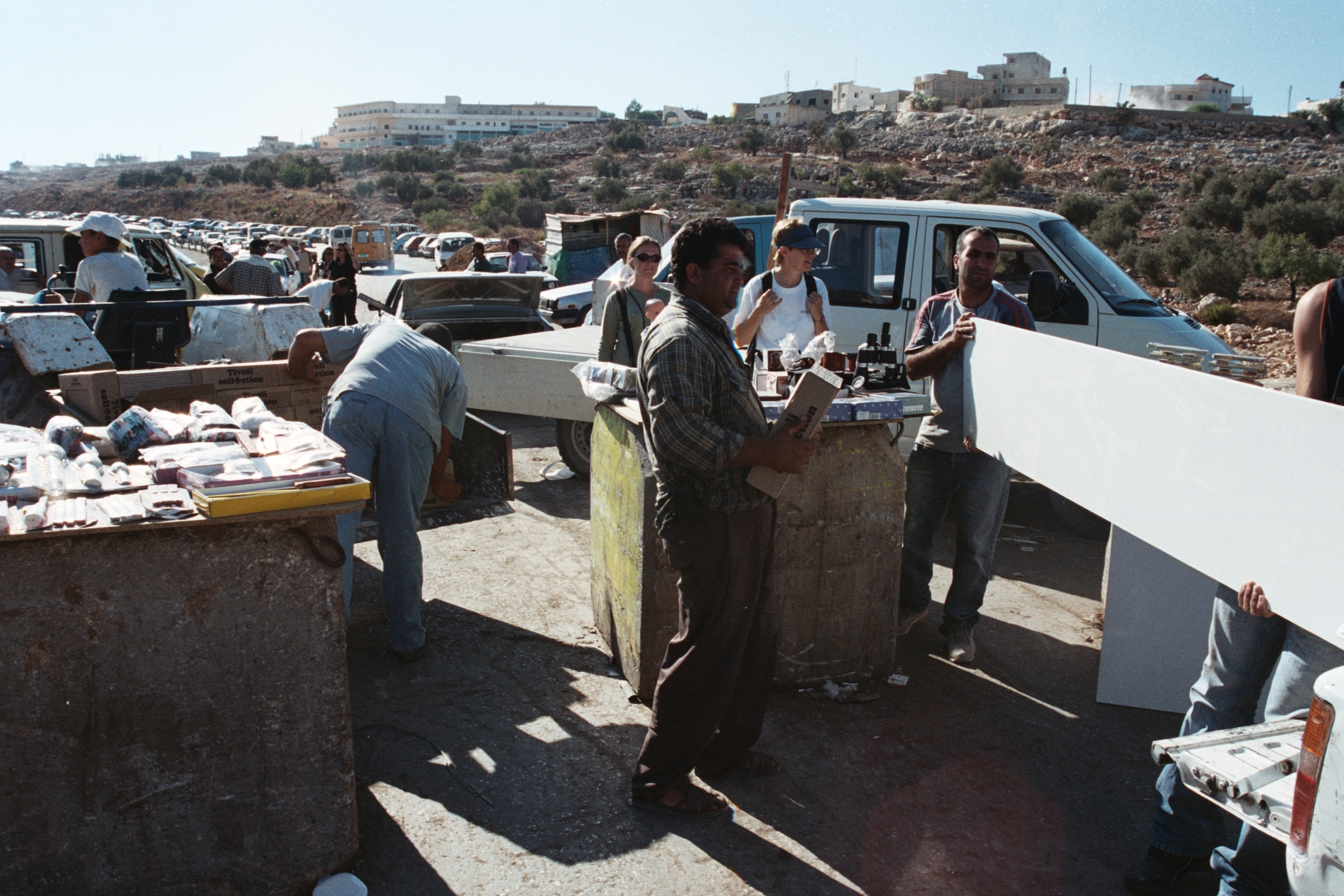
Palestinians moving goods from one side of a roadblock to the other side, 2004.

Israel has forbidden Palestinians to use certain roads in the West Bank and classified these roads for the sole, or practically sole, use of Israelis, first and foremost of settlers. Palestinians are even prohibited from crossing some of these roads with vehicles, thus restricting their access to unprohibited roads on the other side. They are forced to cross the road on foot. The prohibitions on Palestinian travel are based on "verbal orders" given to soldiers.

In 2007, B'Tselem counted some 312 kilometers of main road in the West Bank that were forbidden or restricted to cars with Palestinian number plates. In 2013 this was reduced to some 67 kilometers.

In 2004, Israel proposed the building of a separate road network in the West Bank for the Palestinians parallel to the main highways, to be paid for by the donor countries. It would take the place of the main roads that the Israel Defense Forces prevent Palestinians from accessing, allowing only Israeli cars on them. The donor countries would finance the construction of tunnels and bridges, upgrade existing secondary roads and pave new roads, for a total of about 500 kilometers of roads. The Israeli National Security Council presented the new road network as a solution to the internal closure imposed on the Palestinians. The network would provide "transportation contiguity" for Palestinians and territorial contiguity between the settlements and Israel proper. The Palestinians rejected the Israeli proposal "because it would perpetuate the settlements and consolidate an apartheid regime".

==== Route 443 ====
Professor David Kretzmer, who teaches constitutional law and international law at the Hebrew University of Jerusalem and at the Ramat Gan Law School heavily criticized the closure of Route 443 to Palestinians in Haaretz.

In 2009 Israel's High Court of Justice accepted the Association for Civil Rights in Israel's petition against an IDF order barring Palestinians from driving on Highway 443. The ruling should come into effect five months after being issued, allowing Palestinians to use the road for the first time since October 2000, when it was closed following the outbreak of the second intifada.

=== Freedom of movement of Israeli citizens ===
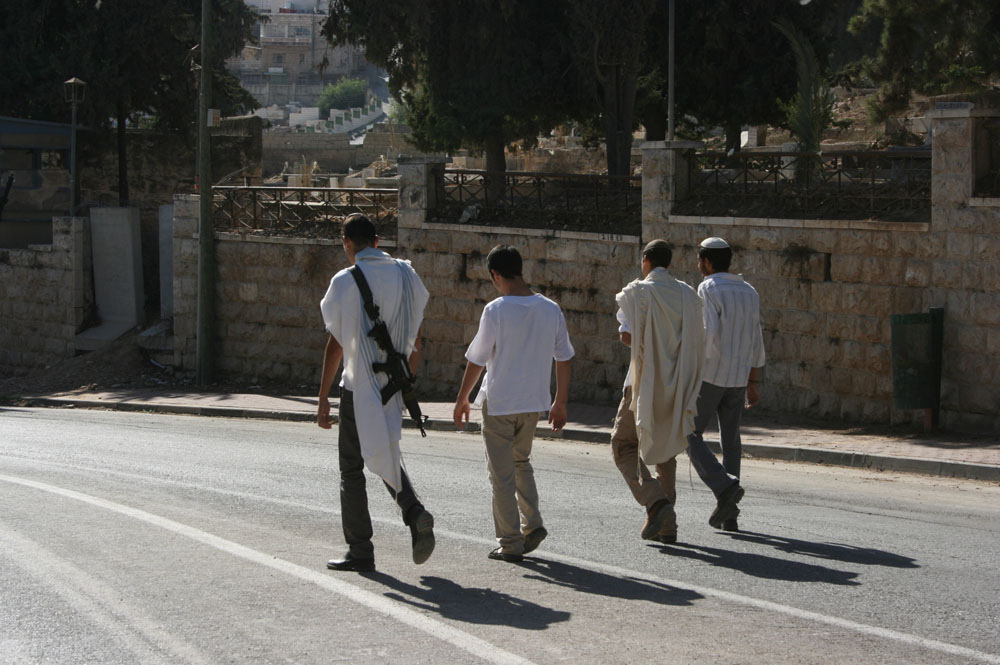
Armed Israeli settlers on al-Shuhada Street in Hebron, occupied West Bank, November 2010

Israeli citizens are not allowed to enter Area A (fully controlled by the Palestinian Authority) or the Gaza Strip without a permit from the IDF, while it is only not recommended for them to enter Area B. Israeli citizens are allowed freedom of movement in Area C and along all main West Bank roads which connect Israeli settlements to each other and to Israel.

== Movement between Gaza and West Bank ==
Under the Oslo Accords, the West Bank and the Gaza Strip are recognized "as a single territorial unit, whose integrity will be preserved during the interim period". Israel, however, has changed this position and now considers the West Bank and the Gaza Strip as "two separate and different areas".

Residents of Gaza are only allowed to travel to the West Bank in exceptional humanitarian cases, particularly urgent medical cases, but not including marriage. It is possible to travel from the West Bank to Gaza only if the person pledges to permanently relocating to Gaza. As Israel so easily allows passage when it comes to a West Bank resident wishing to relocate permanently to Gaza, HaMoked and B'Tselem wonder whether Israels declared considerations mask illegitimate demographic concerns.

In 2013, an advanced container scanner was built at the Kerem Shalom crossing to enable the resumption of imports to and exports from Gaza, while addressing Israel's security concerns. Israel, however, refuses to use the scanner for export to the West Bank because ″for security reasons, Israel wants to isolate the West Bank from the Gaza Strip, and allowing goods from the Strip into the West Bank would contradict this policy.″ The scanner had cost multi-million euros and was donated to the PA by the Dutch government.

=== Gaza–West Bank Safe Passage ===
To ease the free movement between Gaza and the West Bank, a "Safe Passage" was created. As early as 4 May 1994, Israel and the PLO agreed on 3 safe passage routes between Gaza and Jericho. Pending the Permanent Status Negotiations, on 5 October 1999, Israel and the PLO signed a protocol to establish a temporary "safe passage" subject to Israeli control. The protocol was never implemented in full and the Safe Passage functioned only for less than a year, from October 1999 until the outbreak of the Second Intifada in September 2000. This forced Palestinians to travel via Egypt and Jordan which made the journey, usually a few hours' drive, expensive (costing thousands of shekels), extending it to several days, and made them dependent on Egyptian and Jordanian authorities. In principle, Gazans were prohibited from using the Jordan–West Bank crossing border in any case.

After the end of the Intifada, in November 2005, Israel and the PA signed the Agreement on Movement and Access, which also provided for the re-establishment of a safe passage, which never materialized. After the formation of a Hamas-led PA government in March 2006, Israel and the Quartet imposed sanctions against the PA. This included Israeli restrictions on cross-border movements. After the Hamas takeover of the Gaza Strip in June 2007, Israel set up a blockade of the Gaza Strip.

== Movement between Gaza and Israel ==
Gazan residents are only admitted to Israel in exceptional humanitarian cases. Since 2008, they are not allowed to live or stay in Israel because of marriage with an Israeli. Israelis who want to visit their partner in Gaza need permits for a few months, and Israelis can visit their first‐degree relatives in Gaza only in exceptional humanitarian cases.

== Gaza blockade ==
Gaza Strip, with Israeli-controlled borders and limited fishing zone

The Israel Defense Forces left the Gaza Strip on 1 September 2005 as part of Israel's unilateral disengagement plan. An Agreement on Movement and Access (AMA) between Israel and the Palestinian Authority was concluded in November 2005 to improve Palestinian freedom of movement and economic activity in the Gaza Strip. Under its terms, the Rafah crossing with Egypt was to be reopened, with transits monitored by the Palestinian National Authority and the European Union. Only people with Palestinian ID, or foreign nationals, by exception, in certain categories, subject to Israeli oversight, were permitted to cross in and out.

In June 2007 Hamas took control of the Gaza Strip and removed Fatah officials. Following the takeover, Egypt and Israel largely sealed their border crossings with Gaza, on the grounds that Fatah had fled and was no longer providing security on the Palestinian side.

According to B'Tselem, the blockade of Gaza has harmed the Gaza economy and significantly impaired Palestinian trade between the West Bank and the Gaza Strip. Israel has considerably limited the fishing zone along the coast of Gaza, preventing Palestinians access to 85% of the maritime areas allotted to them in the 1994 Gaza–Jericho Agreement. Fishermen are attacked and their boats often seized.

== Gaza air and seaports ==
Israel does not allow operating air and seaports in Gaza, in violation with subsequent agreements between Israel and the Palestinians. The Gaza Airport, funded by donor countries, has been destroyed by Israeli bombardments and bulldozers. A Gaza Seaport project, started in 2000, was destroyed by the Israeli army, a few months after the construction had begun.

== Impact on medical care ==
Ill and wounded Palestinians who require acute medical care are placed at risk by Israeli restrictions on movement. The residents of villages and outlying regions require permits to travel to hospitals located in central regions. Obtaining the permits is difficult, requiring medical documents testifying to the illness as well as confirmation that the hospital is the only facility where the treatment is available and the time and date of the appointment.

According to B'Tselem, even if they have a valid permit, sick Palestinians must travel on long, winding, unmaintained roads and are often delayed for long periods at checkpoints. If they require medical care at night they must wait until checkpoints open during the day. Some Palestinian communities are prevented from using their cars or ambulances so that the sick must travel to the hospitals by foot. In 2007, B'Tselem documented five cases in which ill or wounded Palestinians died after being delayed at a checkpoint. Palestinian hospitals in the West Bank have difficulty functioning due to the delays on the arrival of doctors and staff as a result of the movement restrictions. This has prevented the development of medical expertise in the Palestinian health system as staff are prevented from acquiring in-service training and students are preventing from going to university.

According to program director Colonel Triber Bezalel, the IDF employs humanitarian officers at various checkpoints:

"[to] provide an understanding, helping hand to the Palestinians. Their job is to make life easier for those who cross the borders. To assist women who are holding babies and children, aid the elderly and sick and provide an open ear to Palestinian professionals who have special problems. These are Israel's ambassadors to our Palestinian neighbors and they perform brilliantly".

=== Treatment of pregnant women ===
Obtaining medical treatment is particularly problematic for pregnant Palestinian women about to give birth, since the delivery date is largely unpredictable yet the permits given are only valid for one or two days, as is the case for most sick persons. The women must therefore constantly renew their permits, and as a consequence, in some instances, mothers have entered labor and given birth at checkpoints because they did not have up-to-date permits. In 2007, 5 such births occurred at Israeli checkpoints. Between the years 2000 and 2006, more than 68 Palestinian women gave birth at Israeli checkpoints, according to statistics from the Palestinian health ministry. Of these, 35 women miscarried, and five died in childbirth.

== Economic effects ==
The restrictions on movement put in place following the outbreak of the Second Intifada are widely cited by international financial institutions and human rights bodies as a primary cause of economic contraction, rising unemployment, and poverty in the West Bank.

Following the closure of the West Bank at the start of the Second Intifada, tens of thousands of Palestinians lost employment in Israel and Israeli settlements, where approximately 110,000 Palestinians had previously worked. Subsequent labor access became strictly dependent on military-issued quota permits. Internal checkpoints, physical roadblocks, and permit barriers increased transport costs and segmented the West Bank into isolated local markets, impairing trade, agriculture, and tourism. Importers, exporters, and domestic manufacturers dependent on imported raw materials faced steep cost increases and logistical delays.

A 2007 World Bank report concluded that ongoing Israeli restrictions on access to land, water, and movement render most of the West Bank inaccessible to Palestinian investment, maintaining an unfavorable business environment and suppressing economic potential.

== Legality of restrictions ==
The right to freedom of movement within states is recognized in article 13 of the Universal Declaration of Human Rights, adopted by the United Nations General Assembly in 1948.

B'Tselem has argued that the consequences of the restrictions on the economic status Palestinian population have been so severe that they breach the rights guaranteed by the International Covenant on Economic, Social and Cultural Rights—in particular, the right to a livelihood, the right to an acceptable standard of living, the right to satisfactory nutrition, clothing, and housing, and the right to attain the best standard of physical and mental health.

B'Tselem also argues that the restrictions on ill, wounded and pregnant Palestinians seeking acute medical care is in contravention of international law that states that medical professionals and the sick must be granted open passage.

=== Israeli Court ===
The Israeli Supreme Court has accepted Israel's position, that it has the right to prevent the free movement of people through Israel from the Gaza Strip for security reasons. According to Haaretz's Amira Hass, this policy defies one of the principles of the Oslo Accords, which states that Gaza and the West Bank constitute a single geographic unit.

== See also ==
- Visa requirements for Palestinian citizens
