= Ahmed Fouad Alkhatib =

Palestinian American humanitarian activist and blogger/founder of Realign For Palestine

- أحمد فؤاد الخطيب
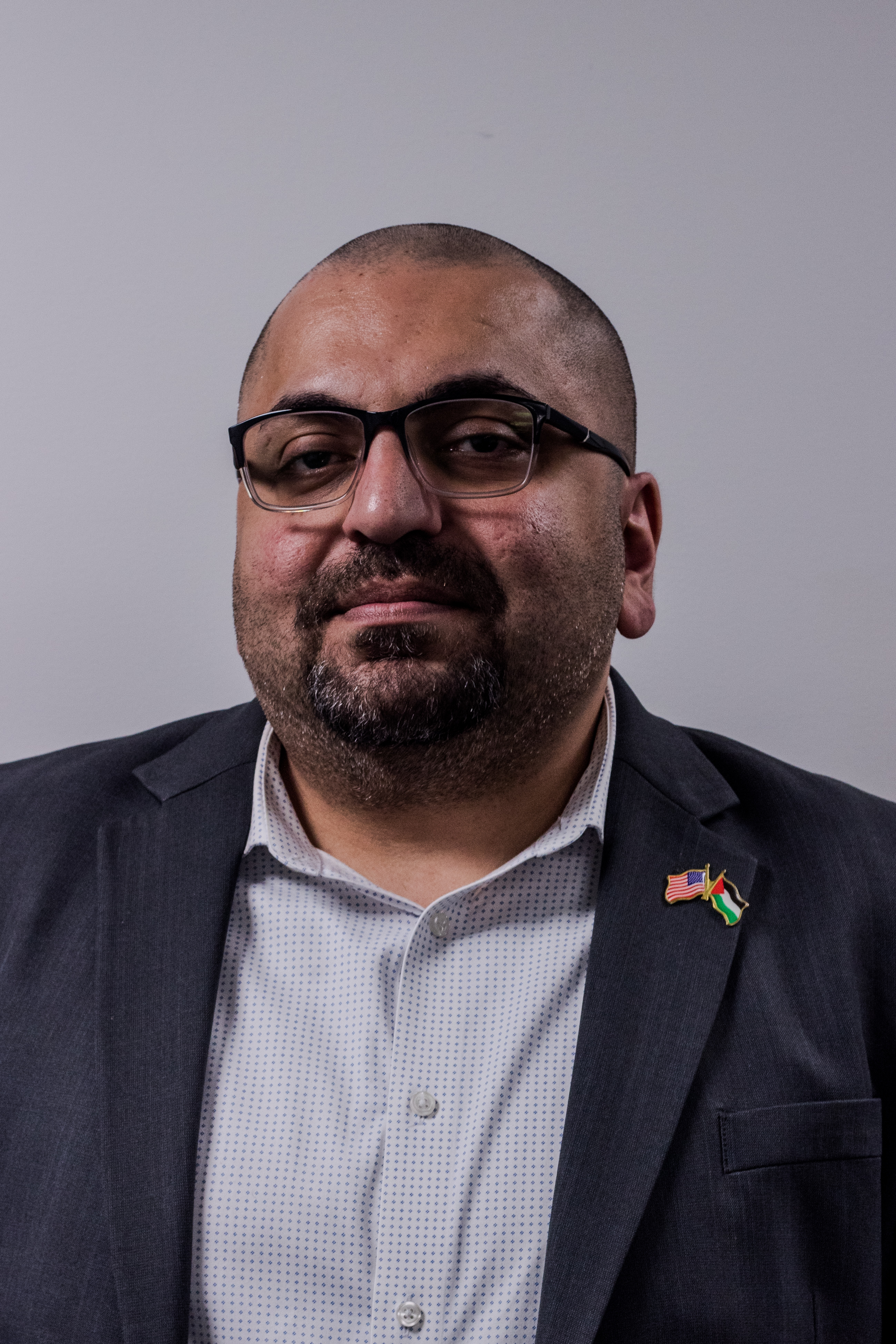
- Alkhatib on March 4, 2026
- Born: April 25, 1990 (age 36); Saudi Arabia
- Citizenship: American
- Occupations: Executive Director, Project Unified Assistance; Nonresident Senior Fellow, Atlantic Council

Ahmed Fouad Alkhatib (Arabic: أحمد فؤاد الخطيب; born April 25, 1990) is a Palestinian American humanitarian activist and blogger. He is the founder and executive director of Project Unified Assistance, a nonprofit organization working towards the establishment of a humanitarian airport in the Gaza Strip, to be run and operated by the United Nations. He is also a senior fellow with the Atlantic Council, and the founder of the organization's Realign For Palestine project.

== Early life and education ==
Alkhatib's family is originally from the Gaza Strip. His grandparents had lived in Hamama and Ramla, but left in 1948 during the 1948 Arab–Israeli War.

Alkhatib was born in Saudi Arabia, where his father worked as a United Nations physician. He and his family returned to Gaza in 2000, and his father began working at the Jabalia refugee camp. Alkhatib's family was devoutly Muslim. As a child, Alkhatib hoped to become a politician or diplomat. At age 11, Alkhatib was caught in an Israeli airstrike, which killed three of his friends and left him with permanent hearing loss in his left ear.

Alkhatib left Gaza in 2005, at the age of 15, for a one-year-long cultural exchange program, part of the U.S. Department of State-sponsored Youth Exchange and Study Program. He spent the year in Pacifica, California, where he learned meditation from his host mother, a Buddhist and retired social worker. He also attended sessions with Living Room Dialogue, a Jewish-Palestinian group based in San Mateo, marking the first time he had spoken to Jews or Israelis.

Upon completing the program in 2006, Alkhatib attempted to return to Gaza via Egypt but was unable to do so. The abduction of an Israeli soldier had resulted in the closure of the Rafah border between Gaza and Egypt. Alkhatib remained in Egypt for months without being able to enter Gaza. He applied for and received political asylum in the U.S., where he finished high school at San Francisco Waldorf High School and went on to City College and the University of San Francisco, where he studied marketing and became interested in social entrepreneurship. In 2023, he earned a master's degree in intelligence studies at American Military University.

== Career ==
Alkhatib has published work in The Atlantic, The Forward, Haaretz, Newsweek, The Times of Israel, The Jewish Chronicle, The Wall Street Journal, The New York Times, and for The Washington Institute for Near East Policy. Alkhatib is a Nonresident Senior Fellow with the Atlantic Council, and also leads the Council's Realign For Palestine project, which advocates for "nonviolence and the two-nation solution as the only credible, humane path forward for peace between the Palestinian and Israeli people."

In June 2025, he appeared on an episode of Surrounded by Jubilee Media, titled "Debating Resistance: 20 Protestors vs 1 Palestinian" in which he debated against pro-Palestinian activists, and argued that, in carrying out the October 7 attacks, Hamas was responsible for "dooming Gazans to the hell that Israel has wrought."

His first book, Hamas and Its Two Million Hostages, was released in July 2026.

== Project Unified Assistance ==
Alkhatib has had a lifelong interest in aviation and desire to work in the field, especially during the time when Gaza's international airport was operational. After the destruction of the Gaza airport by Israeli air strikes during the Second Intifada, he was convinced of the need "to play a role in restoring aviation services to the people of Gaza".

== Personal life ==
Alkhatib became a U.S. citizen in 2014, at the age of 24.

=== 2017 Ben Gurion Airport incident ===
In 2017, while attempting to visit his sister and parents in Israel, Alkhatib was deported from Ben Gurion Airport. Although he is a naturalized U.S. citizen and had not traveled to Palestinian territories for over a decade, Israeli authorities claimed that he was a Palestinian with "active citizenship." Later, Alkhatib published details about what took place during the deportation in an op-ed in The Jerusalem Post.

=== Gaza war ===
Alkhatib has said that 30 of his relatives have been killed during the Gaza war, many of them from Israeli airstrikes. Several relatives, including his uncle Abdullah Shehada, were killed by an Israeli airstrike in 2023.
