= List of airports in Palestine =

This is a list of airports in State of Palestine, grouped by type and sorted by location. There are no currently active airports in Palestine.

== Airports ==
List of airports in Palestine
Territory	Location	ICAO	IATA	Airport name	Fate
Gaza Strip	Rafah	LVGZ	GZA	Gaza International Airport (Note: Renamed "Yasser Arafat International Airport" in 2004, after it had been bombed and shut down.)	Defunct, 2001
Gaza Strip	Khan Yunis	LLAZ	GHK	Gush Katif Airport	Defunct, 2004
West Bank	East Jerusalem	OJJR / LLJR	JRS	Jerusalem Qalandia/Atarot/International Airport (Note: Located in East Jerusalem, occupied by Jordan from 1948 to 1967 and by Israel from 1967 to 1981. The territory was annexed by Israel in 1981.)	Disused, 2000
West Bank	Jenin	--	--	Muqeible Airfield	Defunct, late 1940s

== See also ==
- List of airlines registered with the Palestinian National Authority
- Project Unified Assistance

== General references ==
- Maurer, Maurer (1 January 1961). Air Force Combat Units of World War II History and Insignia. Zenger Pub. ISBN 9780892010929.
- Maurer, Maurer, ed. (1982) [1969]. Combat Squadrons of the Air Force, World War II (PDF) (reprint ed.). Washington, DC: Office of Air Force History. ISBN 0-405-12194-6. LCCN 70605402. OCLC 72556.
