= El Arish International Airport =

El Arish International Airport مطار العريش الدولي
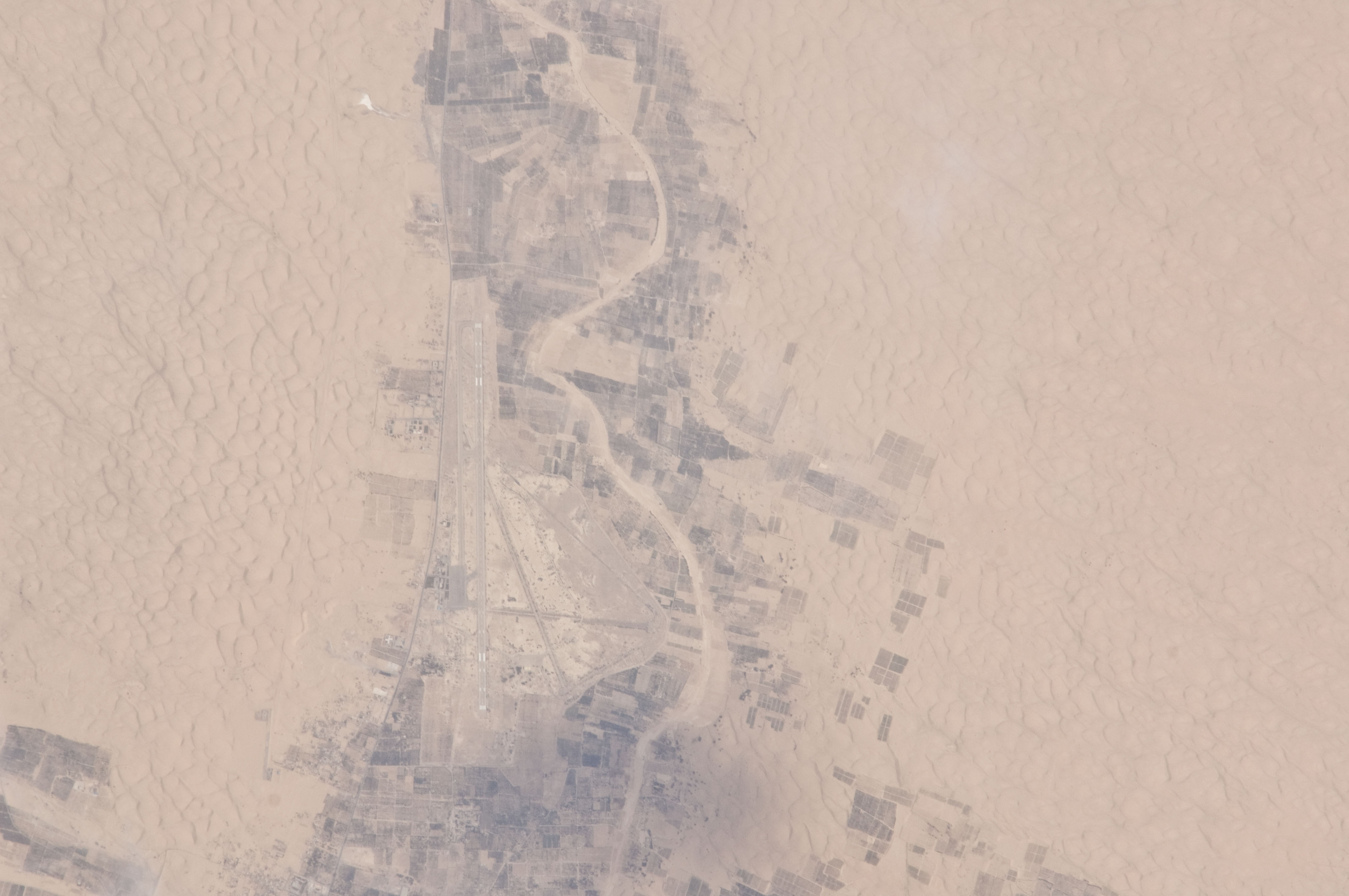
- IATA: AAC; ICAO: HEAR

Summary
- Airport type: Public
- Operator: Government
- Serves: El Arish, Egypt
- Elevation AMSL: 121 ft (37 m)
- Coordinates: 31°02′16.3″N 033°49′8.9″E

Map
- Location of the airport in Egypt Sinai

Runways
Direction	Length		Surface
Direction	m	ft	Surface
16/34	3,019	9,905	Asphalt

Statistics (2011)
- Passengers: 5,991
- Source: DAFIF

El Arish International Airport (Arabic: مطار العريش الدولي) (IATA: AAC, ICAO: HEAR) is an airport south of El Arish, Egypt.

== Location and size ==
The site of the airport is 160 hectares (400 acres) in area. Its terminal has the capacity for 200 passengers per hour. The tarmac, which is 3,019 metres (9,905 ft) long, fits four aircraft.

El Arish is one of the closest airports to the Gaza Strip. El Gora Airport is slightly closer, but smaller. El Arish International Airport is approximately 45 kilometres (28 mi) from the Rafah Border Crossing.

== Operations ==
Palestinian Airlines relocated to El Arish International Airport after Yasser Arafat International Airport was rendered non-operational when the runway was destroyed by Israeli forces in 2001. All Palestinian Airlines flights were grounded from 2005 to 2012.

In 2011 the airport served 5,991 passengers (-45.4% vs. 2010).

In May 2012, Palestinian Airlines restarted two weekly flights to Amman, with flights to Jeddah, Saudi Arabia planned to follow soon after. The airport has been mainly used for Palestinian passengers from the Gaza Strip traveling to Saudi Arabia for hajj and umrah.

Palestinian Airlines ceased operations in December 2020. At the time of Palestinian Airlines' closure, its two Fokker 50 planes—both over 30 years old—operated flights between El Arish, Jordan, and the United Arab Emirates.

During the Gaza war, the airport was used as a staging ground for medical flights to the United Arab Emirates.

== Current operations ==
Egyptair currently serves air transport to Ostend and Cairo. Egyptair uses a Cargo Airbus A330 to operate the route between El Arish and Ostend.

== See also ==
- Transport in Egypt
- List of airports in Egypt
- Six Day War
