= Project Unified Assistance =

American nonprofit organization

- Founded: 2015
- Founded at: San Francisco, California, US
- Type: 501c(3)
- Purpose: humanitarian air operations, freedom of movement
- Headquarters: San Francisco, California, US
- Leader: Ahmed Fouad Alkhatib
- Website: www.pua-gaza.org

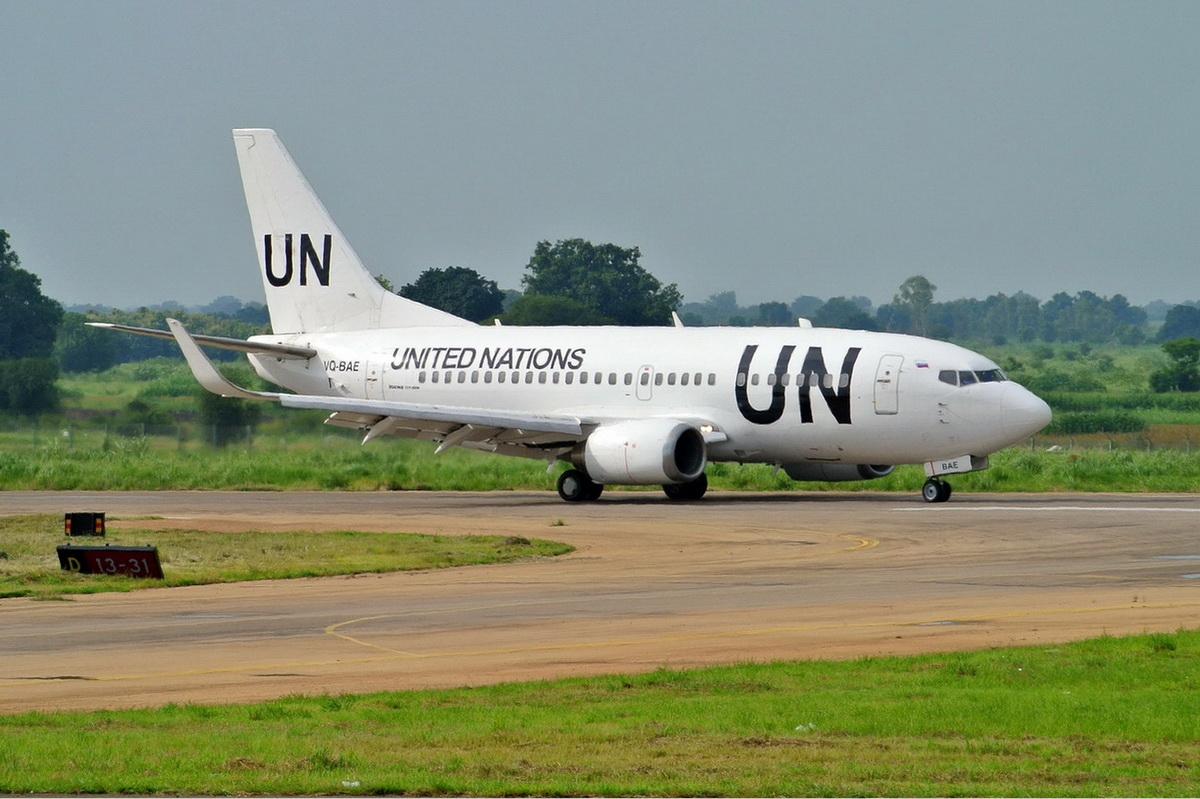
United Nations Boeing (UTair) 737

Project Unified Assistance (PUA) is a nonprofit organization based in San Francisco. The primary focus of the organization is a proposal to establish a humanitarian United Nations-operated airport in the Gaza Strip. PUA believes that the lack of an airport in Gaza infringes on the human right of Gaza citizens to move freely, as well as negatively impacts the economic development and safety of citizens of the region, and that a UN-operated airport can alleviate these issues while ensuring the security of Israel.

== Background ==
=== Organization ===
PUA was founded in 2015 by Ahmed Fouad Alkhatib, an American humanitarian activist who left Gaza in 2005 as a U.S. State Department-sponsored exchange student and was not able to return due to border closure and political instability.

=== Rationale for the cause ===
According to a United Nations Conference on Trade and Development report, restrictions on the movement of people and goods in Gaza have dampened the economic potential of the region and endanger the lives of people in need of medical services abroad. The UN estimates that by 2020, the Gaza strip may become uninhabitable unless trade and travel restrictions in the region are lifted.

Alkhatib founded PUA because he believes that the lack of an airport in Gaza violates the human rights of Gaza citizens to travel freely, and that a UN-operated airport could improve the economy of the area and help Gaza citizens travel more safely, while continuing to maintain the security of Israel and Egypt.

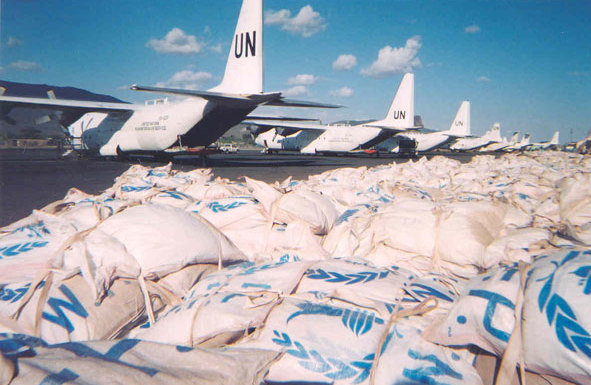
United Nations C-130 delivering food to Sudan

==== History of air travel in Gaza ====
Gaza's third international airport, Yasser Arafat International Airport, began operating in 1998. It hosted Palestinian Airlines and served up to half a million Palestinians a year. During the Second Intifada, restrictions were placed on Palestinians traveling into and out of the area. Between 2000 and 2002, the airport was shut down, bombed in a series of Israeli air attacks, and then bulldozed. The Israeli government claimed the destruction of the airport was justified due to concerns over its use to smuggle arms into the area. It also considered the airport's operations to have violated the terms of the Interim Agreement, which stipulated that Israeli and Palestinian forces were to cooperate on airport operations and maintaining safety. The first airport was opened just to the West of Deir al-Balah in 1926 and was used by Imperial Airways flights from London to India and KLM flights to what is now Indonesia. The second airport was open by the United Nations Emergency Force in 1957 and was operated by the Royal Canadian Air Force and used by both military and civilian personnel for travel between Beirut, Damascus, Jerusalem (Kalandia) and El Arish in Egypt and occasionally Cyprus.

==== Precedent for UN airport operations ====
PUA believes there is historical precedent for a UN-operated airport in Gaza. An airport in Gaza was operated and managed by the UN Emergency Force (UNEF) during the 1950s and 60s. Currently, the United Nations Humanitarian Air Service provides passenger and cargo air services to remote locations that are hazardous or lack local transportation infrastructure. UNHAS serves the World Food Programme and other non-governmental organizations.

== Objectives ==
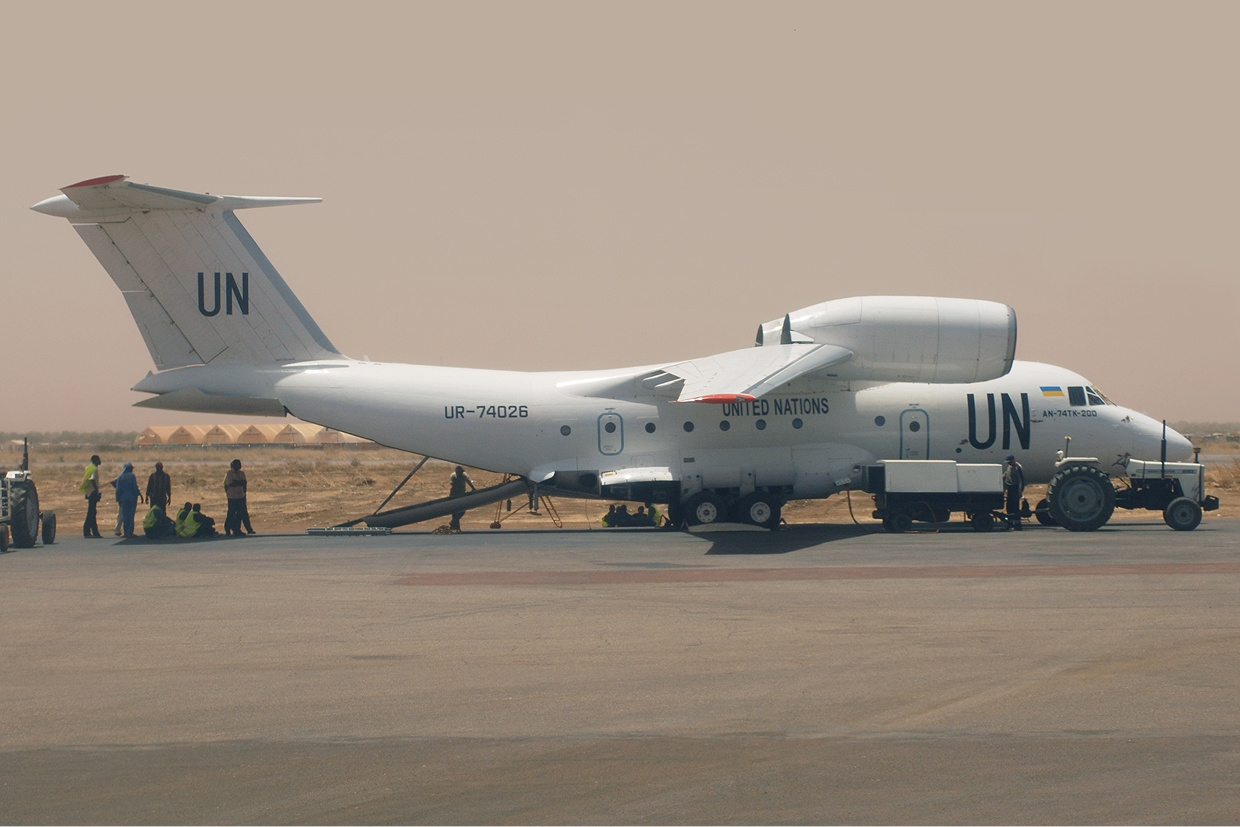
United Nations Antonov AN-74 operating in Sudan

The objective of PUA is to identify a proposal for, encourage implementation of, and provide ongoing support for a humanitarian airport in Gaza.

=== Proposed airport implementation ===
PUA sees the proposed airport being implemented in one of two ways: either by expanding UNHAS or by establishing a new UN agency, along with support from private aviation and security firms, to operate and manage the airport.

==== Location ====
PUA believes that due to various factors, the location of Yasser Arafat International Airport was not ideal. PUA's plan calls for considering a new location away from Egyptian and Israeli borders. It has identified a site on the southwestern coast of Gaza, near the Mediterranean Sea, that it believes to be a suitable location for an airport. This location also takes into account the political and geographic changes in the area since the creation of Yasser Arafat International Airport.

==== Construction and operation ====
PUA proposes for the new airport to be established in phases, with the first phase consisting of constructing the essential facilities needed to operate an airport. PUA estimates that this would cost anywhere from $200 to $500 million, and with adequate political, material, and technical support, could be accomplished in 12 to 18 months. PUA believes that the Palestinian Authority could assist with passport and visa control, and that the United Nations could guarantee Israel's security, ensuring that the facility is used only by civilians and preventing smuggling.

== Reception ==
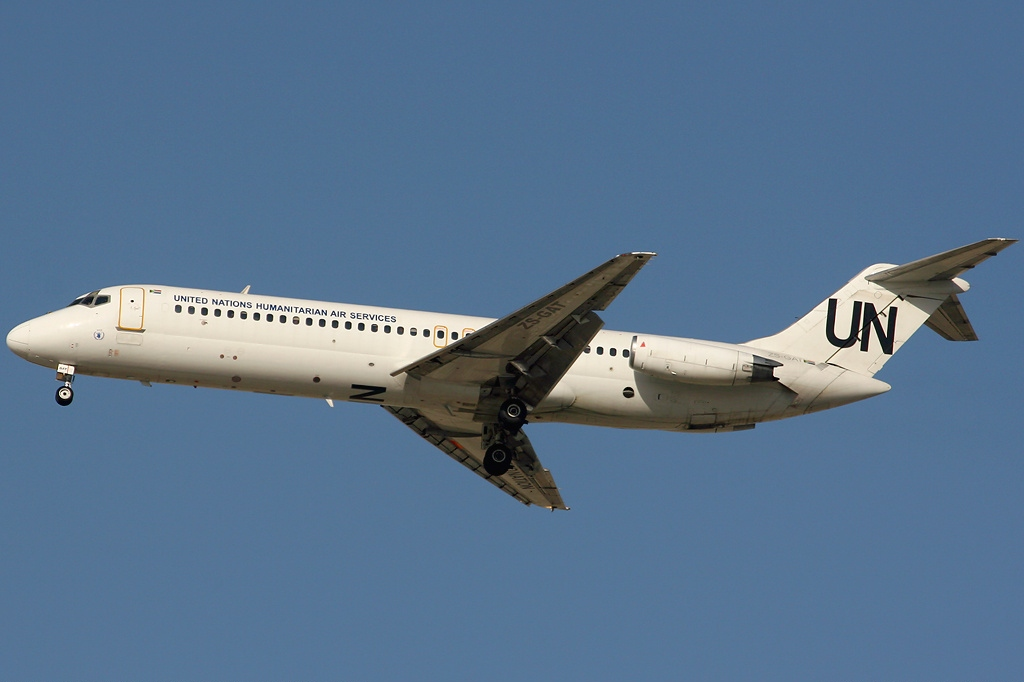
United Nations DC-9

In 2016, Israel's Defense Minister Avigdor Lieberman expressed Israel's willingness to approve the establishment of an airport and a seaport, if Gaza halted aggressive actions. Nickolay Mladenov, the U.N.’s Special Coordinator for the Middle East Peace Process, responded that while the creation of an airport was important, it was less of a concern than other, more pressing issues faced by Palestinians. In response, Alkhatib noted that “the airport is actually a core component of the reconstruction process” that will bring medical supplies, provide economic opportunity, and address other critical issues in the region.

According to PUA, Palestinian President Mahmoud Abbas has provided preliminary approval of the concept and plan for the airport, and employees of relevant UN agencies operating in Gaza have also expressed approval, albeit privately due to the sensitivity of the issue. Hamas has also indicated approval of the airport, canceling plans to build a housing settlement on the area of land where PUA has proposed to build the airport.
