= Agreement on Movement and Access =

2005 Israeli-Palestinian agreement

The Agreement on Movement and Access (AMA) was an agreement between Israel and the Palestinian Authority (PA) signed on 15 November 2005 aimed at improving Palestinian freedom of movement and economic activity within the Palestinian territories, and open the Rafah Crossing on the Gaza–Egypt border. AMA was described as "an agreement on facilitating the movement of people and goods within the Palestinian Territories and on opening an international crossing on the Gaza-Egypt border that will put the Palestinians in control of the entry and exit of people." Part of the agreement was the Agreed Principles for Rafah Crossing.

== Background and purposes ==
Following the start of the Second Intifada in September 2000, Israel considerably restricted the movement of Palestinians within the Palestinian territories and between the territories and Israel and the rest of the world. At the Sharm el-Sheikh Summit on 8 February 2005, acting Palestinian President Mahmoud Abbas pledged that all Palestinian factions would stop all acts of violence against all Israelis everywhere while Israeli Prime Minister Ariel Sharon pledged that Israel would cease all its military activity against all Palestinians everywhere. They both also reaffirmed their commitment to the Roadmap for peace process. Sharon also agreed to release 900 Palestinian prisoners of the 7,500 being held by Israel at the time, and to withdraw Israeli forces from West Bank towns that it had reoccupied during the Intifada. Many consider the Sharm el-Sheikh Summit to mark the end of the Second Intifada.

The Israel Defense Forces and Israeli settlers left the Gaza Strip on 1 September 2005 as part of Israel's unilateral disengagement plan. Under the Oslo Accords of 1993, signed by Israel and the Palestine Liberation Organization (PLO), the PLO agreed that Israel would retain control of all borders of the Palestinian territories. Following the Israeli withdrawal from the Gaza Strip, while retaining its rights under the Oslo Accords, Israel and Egypt agreed that Egypt would assume control of the Egyptian side of the Rafah border crossing, the only crossing on the Egypt–Gaza border, while the Palestinian Authority (PA) would assume control on the Gazan side of the crossing. At the time the PA was dominated by the Fatah faction of the PLO.

To improve the living conditions of the Palestinians and further the peace negotiations, Israel and the PA concluded the AMA, the stated goal of which was ″To promote peaceful economic development and improve the humanitarian situation on the ground″.

== Content of the Agreement ==
The Agreement on Movement and Access provided:

- The Rafah Crossing between Gaza and Egypt would be opened as soon as possible under control of the PA, and under supervision of the European Union. Goods were also permitted transit at the Karni crossing.
- A "Safe Passage" would be established between Gaza and the West Bank.
- The number of "obstacles to movement" in the West Bank would be reduced to the maximum extent possible to be completed by 31 December 2005.
- The construction of a seaport in Gaza could commence.
- The parties would continue discussions on the establishment of an airport.

The Agreed Principles for Rafah Crossing were:

- Rafah Crossing was to be operated by the Palestinian Authority on its side, and Egypt on its side.
- Only people with Palestinian ID, or foreign nationals, by exception, in certain categories, subject to Israeli oversight, were to be permitted to cross in and out. The PA should notify the Israeli authorities 48 hours in advance of the crossing of a person in the excepted categories.
- Rafah would be used for export of goods to Egypt, subject to rigid control. Imports must be cleared by PA customs officials at Kerem Shalom under the supervision of Israeli customs agents.

== Hamas takeover of the Gaza Strip ==
On 25 January 2006, Hamas decisively won control of the Palestinian Legislative Council in the 2006 Palestinian legislative election, and on 29 March, a new PA government led by Hamas leader, Ismail Haniyeh, was formed. However, Hamas leaders refused to accept conditions set by Israel and the Quartet on the Middle East for any relations by them with the Hamas-led PA government, namely recognition of Israel, the disavowal of violent actions, and acceptance of previous agreements between Israel and the PA, including the Oslo Accords. In consequence, Israel and the Quartet ceased providing aid to the PA and stopped all dialogue with any member of the Hamas-led PA government, and imposed sanctions against the PA under Hamas.

Hamas repeatedly declared that it did not recognise the legitimacy of Israel and was not bound by any agreements with Israel, without specifically mentioning the AMA. With these sequence of events, the AMA was taken to have no relevance to Hamas.

In June 2007, after the Hamas takeover of the Gaza Strip, Hamas replaced all Fatah and PA officials in the Gaza Strip with Hamas members. Fatah resumed its dominance in the West Bank. Israel lifted its sanctions and other measures against the PA and the West Bank, but the measures against the Hamas-dominated Gaza Strip continued. The Quartet also restored relations with the PA in the West Bank, but not with the Hamas-dominated Gaza Strip. Egypt largely sealed its border crossing with the Gaza Strip on the grounds that Fatah and the PA had fled and the PA was no longer providing security on the Palestinian side.

== Implementation ==
AMA stipulated the opening hours of crossings between Gaza and Israel and the number of trucks/truckloads to pass through them. It also stipulated that bus convoys, carrying Palestinians from Gaza to the West Bank and vice versa, would start on 15 December 2005; and truck convoys, carrying goods on the same route, would start on 15 January 2006.

Palestinians, especially Hamas, insist that AMA still applies, and that it has not been honoured by Israel in relation to movement of people between Gaza and the West Bank, as neither bus nor truck convoys started by their respective dates. Israel first announced that according to its interpretation, Israel was only obliged to run a "test" or "pilot" bus route and only for Palestinians meeting certain Israeli-specified requirements, then delayed this pilot project "indefinitely". The part of the agreement concerning opening hours and throughput of border crossings was not implemented either. Gazans have been invariably banned from entering the West Bank, and Israel adopted the position that they have no legal right to do so. This position has not changed since 2005.
