= San Francisco Waldorf School =

Private Waldorf school in San Francisco

Coordinates: 37°47′27.1″N 122°26′30.9″W

- High school: 470 West Portal Ave. Grade school: 2938 Washington St. Preschool/nursery: 3101/3105 Sacramento St. San Francisco Bay Area; California

Information
- School type: Private, Waldorf
- Motto: Know yourself, know the world.
- Founded: 1979
- Faculty: 85
- Grades: Parenting, nursery/preschool, grades 1–12
- Enrollment: ~420
- Student to teacher ratio: 6:1
- Campus type: Urban
- Athletics: 8 sports
- Athletics conference: Bay Counties League - Central
- Mascot: Wolverine
- Website: www.sfwaldorf.org

San Francisco Waldorf School (SFWHS) is an independent preK–12 school in San Francisco, California. The school is based on the principles of Waldorf education. The kindergarten and grade school are located at 2938 Washington Street and the high school is located at 470 West Portal Avenue. About 50% of students at the high school also attended the grade school, the rest coming from public, parochial, and other independent schools. It is accredited by the Western Association of Schools and Colleges (WASC) and the Association of Waldorf Schools of North America (AWSNA).

== Mission ==
"Waldorf education fosters students' intellectual, social, and emotional growth as they pass through distinct stages of development, from childhood to adulthood. Creative play in the early years is followed by arts-infused academic learning in the grade school and intellectual inquiry in the high school."

== History ==
San Francisco Waldorf School was founded in September 1979 under the pedagogical direction of R. Monique Grund, a longtime Waldorf teacher. It moved to the present grade school location after 1984. In 1997, San Francisco Waldorf School inaugurated its high school, with its first class graduating in 2001. The high school's first location was in Fort Mason, and after a few years moved to the Inner Mission district. In 2007 SFWHS moved to its permanent location at 470 West Portal Avenue, a LEED certified building surrounded by open space.

== High school ==
=== Campus ===
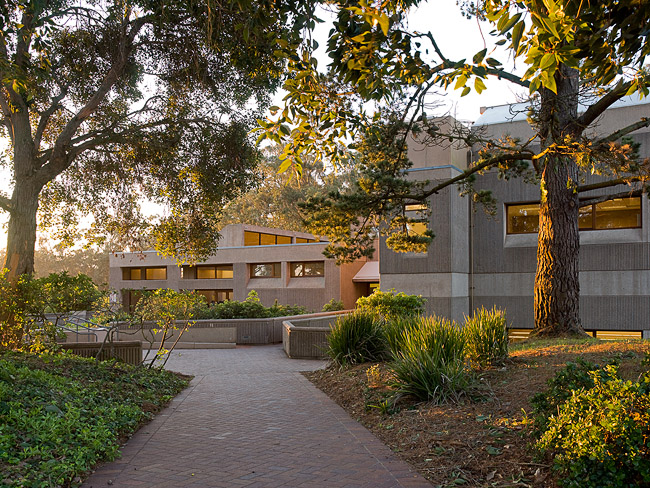
SFWS High School

San Francisco Waldorf High School is located in the West Portal neighborhood of San Francisco and is easily accessible by car or public transportation. The building, originally constructed in 1972, was remodeled to include a number of classrooms, state-of-the-art labs, a library, offices, art rooms, and a few large meeting rooms. It is LEED certified at the Gold level as of 2011.

=== Academics/curriculum ===
SFWHS is a college preparatory high school based on the principles of Waldorf education, formulated by the Austrian philosopher Rudolf Steiner during the 1920s. Most of the school's faculty members hold advanced degrees in their subject areas, and many hold PhDs. Performing and fine arts teachers, as well as craftspeople, come from the professional arts community of the city, and bring extensive work and performance experience. The faculty has an average of eight years of experience in the Waldorf curriculum.

The academic program provides a broad and rigorous curriculum in math, art, science, and the humanities. Following the Waldorf approach, SFWHS teaches in a way that is developmentally appropriate for the age of the students. Thus, in ninth grade, much of the subject material revolves around the contrast of polarities, while in twelfth grade the material allows the students to connect with the world around them and to begin to envision their place in the world. The high school is also known for obtaining a majority of classes taught by professors or those with advanced degrees.

=== Arts ===
The arts are an important part of the student experience at SFWHS. Not only do students have studio and practical arts classes all four years, but artistic expression penetrates the other subjects as well. For example, careful geometric renderings make math classes less abstract and more accessible.

In addition to a strong visual arts program, SFWHS has a comprehensive performing arts program. Every student is required to take a performing arts or music class twice weekly. Classes include orchestra, world music, drumming, and more. The Eurythmy Troupe also meets at this time, and prepares for public performances in February followed by an annual international tour. SFWHS's drama program includes classes, a school production, and a senior play.

=== Athletics ===
SFWHS' athletics program fields cross country, boys' and girls' soccer, boys' and girls' basketball, girls' volleyball, and boys' baseball. All teams compete through the Bay Counties League Central, under the umbrella of the Bay Area Conference.

The high school also has a comprehensive outdoor education program that is built into the year in an academically appropriate way. For example, the eleventh grade always travels to Mount Lassen in the fall, to study astronomy.

== Grade school ==
=== Campus ===
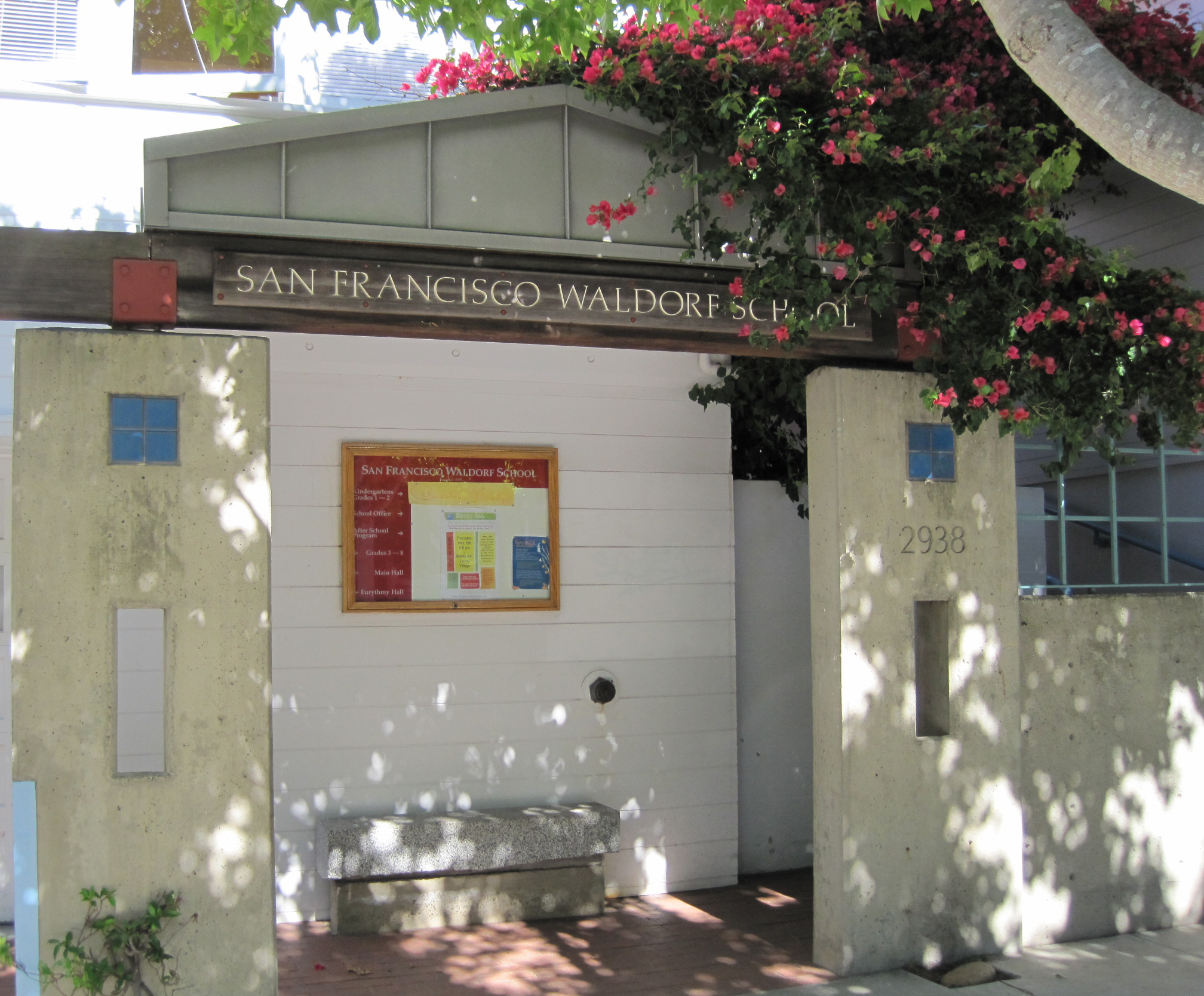
SFWS Grade School

San Francisco Waldorf Grade School is at 2938 Washington Street in the lower Pacific Heights neighborhood. The school first moved onto the location in 1980 into buildings that currently house the kindergartens, offices, and lower grades, and built a new building in 1989 that houses the upper grades and performance spaces. The school also uses a nearby space on Sacramento Street for its small nursery program. In addition to buildings, the grade school campus has a biodynamically-inspired garden and a couple of outdoor play areas. This outdoor space is augmented by a large city park that is a block from the school, and the Presidio of San Francisco, a National Park that is a short walk from the school.

=== Curriculum ===
San Francisco Waldorf Grade School has three kindergartens for children 4 to 6; grades 1 through 8; a nursery program for children 2 ¾ years to 4; and a parent-child program with classes for children aged 0 to 3 and their parents.

In Waldorf education the focus is on a developmentally appropriate curriculum that engages the whole child. Art, music, and movement are integrated into the daily life of the classroom, allowing for the academic study to penetrate more deeply. In the early childhood programs, the emphasis is on rhythm and play. As the children grow older and progress through the grades, the overarching yearly themes meet the children's developmental needs. In the grades, the days begin with a two-hour main lesson of language arts, math, science, and social studies that is followed by a variety of track classes, including Spanish, Mandarin, music, handwork, and, as the children grow, advanced math and woodworking.

=== Community ===
San Francisco Waldorf Grade School is a non-sectarian school with a commitment to engaging San Francisco's diverse cultures, religions, languages, and values. It has active and engaged parent involvement directed through the Parents' Association. Together with the school administration, the parents support a number of festivals and community gatherings throughout the year, such as the Winter Fair. An active Multicultural Council promotes awareness through cultural social and events.

== Notable alumni ==
- Ahmed Fouad Alkhatib, Palestinian American activist

== See also ==
- San Francisco County high schools
