= Shehada family strike =

Israeli attack on a Palestinian family

- Part of the Gaza war and genocide
- Location within the Gaza Strip
- Location: Rafah, southern Gaza Strip
- Date: 14 December 2023
- Attack type: Airstrike
- Deaths: 30+ Palestinians
- Injuries: 10+ Palestinians
- Perpetrator: Israel Defense Forces

On 14 December 2023, the Israeli Air Forces targeted the house of Abdallah Shehada in Rafah, Gaza Strip. The airstrike killed the retired surgeon and former director of Abu Yousef Al-Najjar Hospital alongside 29 other civilians, including 11 children, seven men and 11 women. At least 10 others were wounded.

== Airstrike and casualties ==
Around noon on Thursday, December 14, an airstrike targeted the home of Abdullah Shehada, a retired surgeon and former director of Abu Yousef Al-Najjar Hospital, as well as his family and others sheltering in it at the time. The strike reportedly killed 29 members of the Shehada family and others sheltering in the building, including 11 children.

According to Amnesty International, "The oldest victim of the attack was Hamdi Abu Daff, a displaced 86-year-old man, and the youngest was Ayla Nasman, aged three months."

== Reactions ==
One relative of the Shehada family, Ahmed Fouad Al-Khatib, is a Palestinian-American activist. In March 2024, Alkhatib contributed to an obituary of his uncle, Abdallah Shehada, in The New York Times, writing:

He performed complicated operations on Gaza’s war wounded while running Abu Yousef Al-Najjar Hospital in Rafah until his retirement. His wife, also a doctor, died of cancer, and he dealt with loneliness by hosting large meals to bring people into his home.

Abdallah's name was remembered in an opinion piece by Israeli Haaretz columnist Gideon Levy in March 2024.

Amnesty International independently researched the attack and found no evidence of a military target inside or near the house. They alleged that this finding raises serious concerns that the attack was directed towards civilians and civilian objects.
