= Dahaniya =

Former settlement in Gaza Strip

Dahaniya: דהנייה (Hebrew); الدهنية (Arabic)
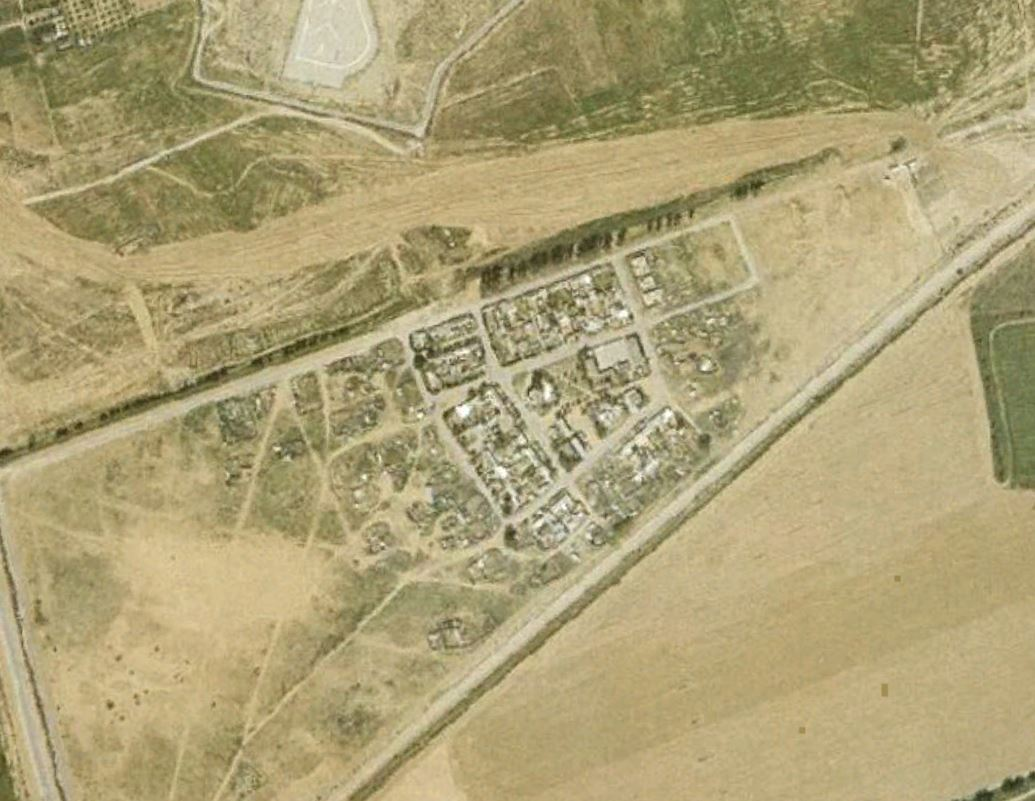
- Satellite photo of Dahanyia in 2004, before it was demolished

- Location within Northwest Negev region of Israel Location within Israel
- Coordinates: 31°13′30″N 34°16′20″E
- Country: Israel
- Founded: 1977
- Population (2005): 500

Dahaniya (Arabic: الدهنية; Hebrew: דהנייה) was a village near the southernmost point in the Gaza Strip, evacuated in Israel's disengagement of 2005.

Dahaniya was located in a no man's land between Israel and the Gaza Strip, in between the kibbutz of Kerem Shalom and the city of Rafah, south of Yasser Arafat International Airport (also called Dahaniya Airport) and close to the Egyptian border. It had been administered by the Israeli Civil Administration since the Oslo accords.

== History ==
=== Creation ===
Dahaniya was founded in 1977 as a sanctuary for Bedouin collaborators with Israel from the Sinai Peninsula. In 1976 the elders of the Egyptian-Bedouin tribe had reached an agreement with the Israeli government regarding exchange of land. They had given Israel property rights for land in Sinai on which to found villages, and in exchange, they had been given the rights to the village of Dahaniya. Hundreds of Bedouin families from the Sinai desert found refuge there.

In June 1978, there was an official ceremony to inaugurate the newly-built houses in the village. While the houses were in the Gaza Strip, the agricultural land were mostly in the Sinai Peninsula. The Jewish National Fund helped train the residents how to grow tomatoes.

=== Development ===
In 1979, just two years after the village's founding, the Egypt–Israel peace treaty was signed. This allowed some residents who wished to return to Egypt to do so.

In the following decades, the residents of Dahaniya collaborated with Israeli security forces in their efforts to locate those it deemed as infiltrators, and families of collaborators from the West Bank and Gaza Strip joined the village. In 1994 many of the residents left the village to the larger cities in Israel (including Tel Aviv and Beersheba).

The Palestinians considered the residents of Dahaniya traitors and worthy of execution, and it was nicknamed the "village of the collaborators". Since the beginning of the Second Intifada, Dahaniya residents feared for their lives. Village residents were banned from entering the Gaza Strip, the village was ringed by a security fence, and the entry and exit into the village was administered by Israel. Among the Palestinians who would enter the village regularly were teachers, doctors, water and electricity workers and traders. The Kerem Shalom border crossing was used by residents working in Israel and the Gush Katif settlements. Some of the residents held Israeli documents, while others held Palestinian documents (issued by the Israeli Civil Administration).

=== Dismantlement ===
During the Israeli disengagement from Gaza in 2005, the village's residents were evacuated to different areas as part of the disengagement. Around 40 families were evacuated to Tel Arad, Israel, while others had to leave for Egypt or integrate into a Gaza Strip governed by the Palestinian Authority. There were reports of disagreements with locals among those who went to Tel Arad as a result of unequal treatment from the Israeli state.

All of the buildings in the village except for the mosque were subsequently destroyed by Israeli bulldozers. From 2008 onwards, the Kerem Shalom border crossing was expanded, and included the site of the former village.

== Bibliography ==
- Nessman, Ravi (29 May 2005). "Collaborators' village". Associated Press.
