= Palestinian Airlines =

Palestinian airline (1995–2020)

Palestinian Airlines الخطوط الجوية الفلسطينية

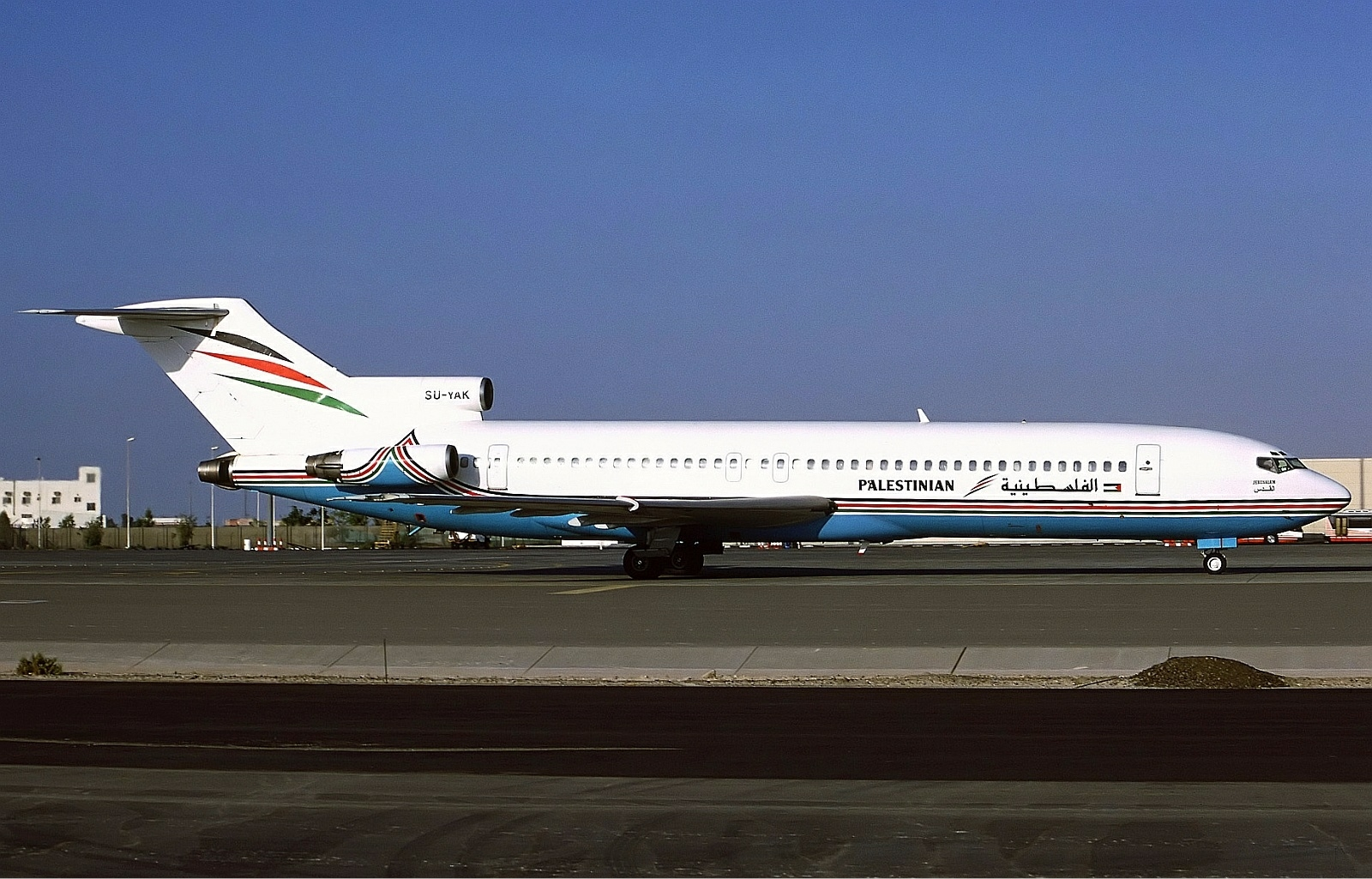
- A Palestinian Airlines Boeing 727-200 at Dubai International Airport in 1999.
IATA	ICAO	Call sign
PF	PNW	PALESTINIAN
- Founded: 1995
- Ceased operations: December 2020
- Hubs: El Arish International Airport
- Fleet size: 2
- Destinations: 2
- Headquarters: Gaza City, Gaza Strip, Palestine
- Key people: Saad Eddin Kharma, Chairman
- Website: web.archive.org/web/20181223121236/http://palairlines.net/

Palestinian Airlines was an airline headquartered in Gaza City, Palestine, and based at El Arish International Airport in Arish, Egypt. Fully owned by the Palestinian Authority, it commenced operations in 1995 and offered flights in the Middle East. In 2020, the company was put into liquidation after years of limited operations.

== History ==
The airline was established on 1 January 1995 and started operations in June 1997, with series of charter flights carrying pilgrims to Jeddah, Saudi Arabia. The flights were operated from Port Said, in northern Egypt. Scheduled services began on 23 July 1997, operating from Arish to Jordan and Saudi Arabia.

Palestinian Airlines acquired a second Boeing 727 in addition to an already leased one in May 1998. Shortly after, it transferred its base to Gaza following the opening of the airport in November 1998 and added a number of new routes in the region. By mid-2000, the company was operating to seven destinations, stretching from Larnaca in the west to Dubai in the east. The airline was grounded in October 2000 following the start of the Second Intifada and was forced to move to El Arish International Airport in December 2001, after bulldozing of the runway by Israel at its previous base Yasser Arafat International Airport, where it operated limited services.

It stopped its operations in 2005 but resumed limited services in May 2012. It had 98 employees as of March 2007. Palestinian Airlines was wholly owned by the Palestinian Authority but not recognized by the Egyptian Ministry of Civil Aviation. It also was a member of the Arab Air Carriers' Organization.

In summer 2020, a long term leasing agreement for both the airline's aircraft with Niger Airlines ended, worsening its financial situation. As of September 2020, both of the airline's Fokker 50 were offered for sale. In December 2020, the liquidation of Palestinian Airlines was announced, with the Palestinian Authority not seeing a positive future perspective, marking the end of its operations. At the time of closure, only eight employees remained.

== Destinations ==
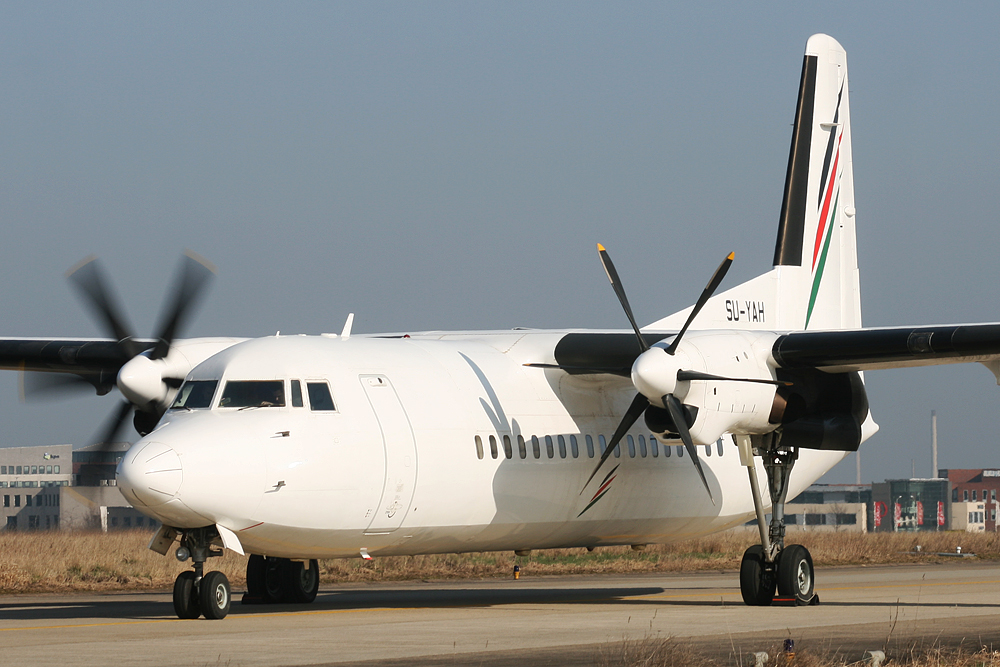
A Palestinian Airlines Fokker 50 in 2012.

Palestinian Airlines served the following destinations as of May 2013:

Egypt

- Arish – El Arish International Airport Base

Saudi Arabia

- Jeddah – King Abdulaziz International Airport

=== Former aircraft ===
The airline previously operated the following aircraft:

- Fokker 50
- Boeing 727-100
- Boeing 727-200
- Bombardier Dash 8-300
- Ilyushin Il-62
