= Gaza Seaport plans =

Planned seaport in the Gaza Strip

Gaza Seaport is a planned seaport in the Gaza Strip. The establishment of a Gaza seaport was mentioned in the Oslo I Accord, as early as 1993. The 1999 Sharm el-Sheikh Memorandum determined that the construction works could commence on 1 October 1999. The project started on 18 July 2000, but was stopped in an early stage due to obstruction of the supply of construction materials, and destruction by the Israeli army in September and October 2000 when the Second Intifada inflamed. The 2005 Agreement on Movement and Access, following Israel's withdrawal from Gaza, re-announced the start of the works. Israel promised to assure donors that it will not interfere with operation of the port. As of 2014, however, the construction has not been resumed.

== Seaport plans in the peace process ==
The 1993 Oslo I Accord announced a program for the establishment of a Gaza Sea Port Area. Plans were re-announced in the 1994 Gaza–Jericho Agreement. The 1999 Sharm el-Sheikh Memorandum determined that the construction works could commence on 1 October 1999, but construction did not start until July 2000. Israel committed itself to facilitate the works. The Memorandum also determined that the port would not be operated in any way before reaching a joint Sea Port Protocol. Such a protocol, however, has never been signed.

== 1994/2000 PA plan ==
In 1994, the Dutch Government committed some NLG45 million (circa €23 million) to the Gaza Sea Port project; France committed additional US$20 million. The same year, the Palestinian Authority (PA) and the Dutch-French European Gaza Development Group (EGDG) signed a contract for the project. It was difficult to reach consensus with Israel on issues regarding engineering, operations and security. Due to Israeli obstruction, the 1994 contract expired before the works could start.

On 20 April 2000, the parties signed a new contract. Phase one of the project started on 18 July. The construction was halted, as Israel refused to facilitate the supply of needed construction materials. On 17 and 18 September 2000, Israeli tanks destroyed the project site. In October, Israel bombed the building site in response to an incident in Ramallah. Following this, the Donor States ceased funding the project and the work on the port stopped.

== 2011 Israeli plan ==
In March 2011, Israeli transport minister Yisrael Katz revealed a plan to build an island off the coast of the Gaza Strip with sea and air ports, a tourist area and a desalination plant for sea water. The island might be managed by the Palestinian Authority and could be under international control for at least 100 years to ensure Israel's security. The project would cost US$5 billion to $10 billion and take six to 10 years to complete.

Katz said that the project would free Israel of responsibility for controlling commerce with Gaza and "aims at a total break with the Gaza Strip, while now Israel continues to be responsible for the trade of this area because we have not permitted the building of a port and airport" ... "would allow us to break all ties with Gaza while maintaining our control over maritime security through the blockade, which is critical in blocking arms traffic" [and the plan would allow Israel] "to take the initiative, gain international support and open a political horizon on the key question of Gaza, without having to rely on Hamas."

Environmentalists and Palestinian officials described the venture as "fantasy" and "madness", and accused the minister of political opportunism. A PA spokesman said that there were many simpler measures to improve the lives of Palestinians. "If they want to help Palestinians, they must end the siege on Gaza, and allow the reintegration of the West Bank and Gaza and the establishment of a Palestinian state. Then they are welcome to make proposals."

== 2014 PA plan ==
In February 2014, Palestinian Transportation Minister Nabil Dmeidi revealed that the Palestinian Authority and Egypt have been working on plans for building two airports in the West Bank, as well as a seaport in the Gaza Strip and a railway line between the Gaza Strip and Cairo. The transport ministry has signed a protocol of cooperation with Egypt's civil aviation authority to benefit from Egyptian expertise. The plans included the building of an airport east of Jericho and a second, smaller one, somewhere in Area C.

In May 2014, the Euro-Mid Observer for Human Rights released a working paper about the possibilities to realize the Seaport plans as an answer to the blockade of the Gaza Strip.

== Port of Gaza City ==
Currently, Gaza only has a small port in Gaza City, the Port of Gaza. It is the home port of Palestinian fishing-boats and the Palestinian naval police. The Port of Gaza has been under Israeli siege since 2007, when Israel imposed a strict blockade on Gaza. The blockade was put on Gaza after Hamas starts firing rockets into civilian areas in Israel. Egypt also responded with a blockade and bulldozed half of Raffa to create a buffer zone between Gaza and Egypt.

== 2024 United States military plan ==
In 2024, in response to concerns over the risk of famine as a result of the Gaza war, President Joe Biden announced a plan for the U.S. military to construct a temporary port on the Gaza Coast, in order to allow for increased humanitarian aid. The plan involves a maritime corridor connecting Gaza with Cyprus, and that the military was not planning for "an operation that would require U.S. boots on the ground." The plan involves deploying a large floating modular unloading platform about three miles offshore, allowing supplies to be then transferred by lighters to a modular causeway off the shore.
