= Yasser Arafat International Airport =

Defunct airport in the Gaza Strip, Palestine

Yasser Arafat International Airport مطار ياسر عرفات الدولي
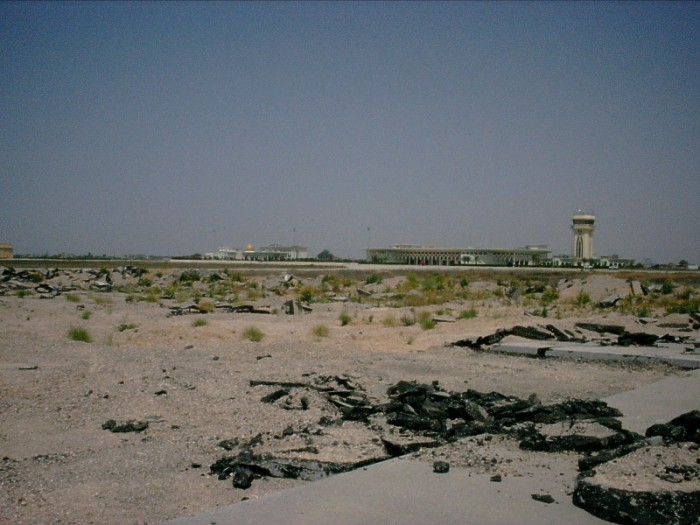
- The airport in 2005
- IATA: GZA; ICAO: LVGZ

Summary
- Airport type: Defunct
- Operator: Palestinian Civil Aviation Authority
- Location: Gaza Strip
- Opened: 24 November 1998
- Closed: 2001
- Elevation AMSL: 98 m (322 ft)
- Coordinates: 31°14′47″N 34°16′34″E
- Interactive map of Yasser Arafat International Airport

Runways
Direction	Length		Surface
Direction	m	ft	Surface
01/19	3,076	10,092	Asphalt

Yasser Arafat International Airport (Arabic: مطار ياسر عرفات الدولي, romanized: Maṭār Yāsir 'Arafāt ad-Dawli) (IATA: GZA, ICAO: LVGZ) was an airport in the Gaza Strip. It was located between Rafah and Dahaniya, close to the Egyptian border. The facility was built as a result of the Oslo Accords and opened on 24 November 1998 as Gaza International Airport. It served as the base of Palestinian Airlines. The airport ceased operations in 2001 during the Second Intifada and was renamed in honour of Palestinian leader Yasser Arafat following his death in 2004. The Gaza airport was progressively destroyed by Israel during the intifada and later conflicts and by looting.

== History ==
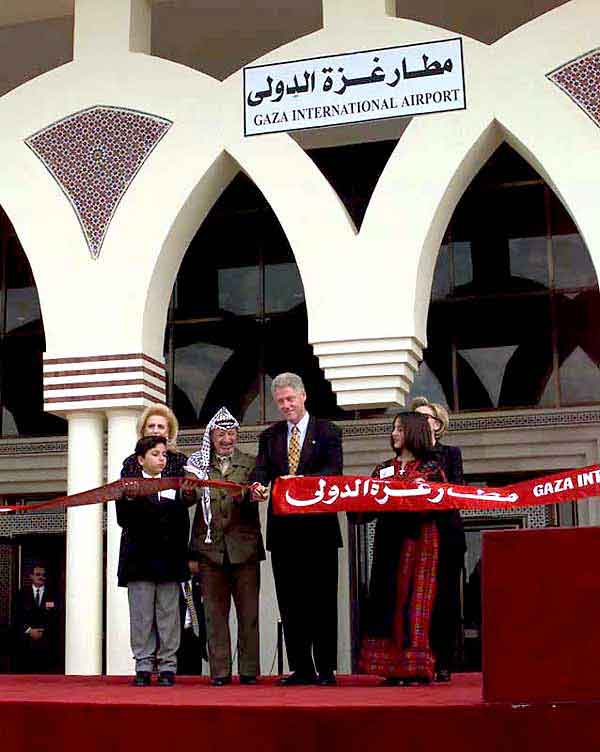
Clinton and Arafat at the ribbon cutting in 1998

Israel and the Palestine Liberation Organization agreed to build airports in the West Bank and Gaza Strip as part of the Oslo Accords. However, the agreements did not contain specifics, such as when the airports would be constructed or how large they would be. Work began on a large airport in southern Gaza, which contrasted with the Israeli expectations of a small facility suited for local flights. It was built with funding from Egypt, Spain, and Germany and was designed by Moroccan architects. The total cost was US$61 million. An impasse in the peace negotiations delayed the airport's opening by over a year, until Israel permitted operations to begin as part of the Wye River Memorandum.

The airport opened on 24 November 1998, and was named Gaza International Airport. Palestinian leader Yasser Arafat presided over the inauguration ceremony. Palestinian Airlines relocated to Gaza from El Arish, Egypt, and operated the first commercial flight to Amman on 5 December. US president Bill Clinton landed at the airport on 14 December, and took part in a ribbon cutting. The opening of the airport was described at the time as evidence of progress toward Palestinian statehood and of collaboration between Israelis and Palestinians.

The airport was operated by the Palestinian Civil Aviation Authority. Passengers underwent security screening by Israeli soldiers at the Rafah crossing, and then took a bus to the terminal. The airport received 90,000 passengers and more than 100 tons of cargo in 1999. Palestinian Airlines linked Gaza to six cities in the region, such as Dubai and Larnaca, by May 2000. Four foreign carriers also served the airport, including Royal Air Maroc and Egyptair. Work commenced on another south wing terminal in 2000, funded by Japan. The Israelis and Palestinians planned to manage security jointly in the terminal so there would be less of a need for travellers to go to the Rafah crossing.

=== Second Intifada ===
The Second Intifada broke out in September 2000, and the airport saw its last flight depart in 2001. The Israeli military bombed the radar station and bulldozed the runway in December 2001. It broke up the runway again the following month. Israel feared that the Palestinians would use the airport to smuggle in weapons and militants. The International Civil Aviation Organization condemned Israel in March 2002 for the attack.

The facility was renamed for Arafat after he died in 2004. Airport personnel still staffed the ticket counters and baggage areas, hoping to deter looting and further Israeli attacks. Construction of the south wing continued slowly. After the 2005 Sharm El Sheikh Summit and Israel's unilateral withdrawal from the Gaza Strip, Israel and the Palestinian Authority signed the Agreement on Movement and Access, in which they agreed to discuss reopening the airport.

=== Under Hamas rule ===
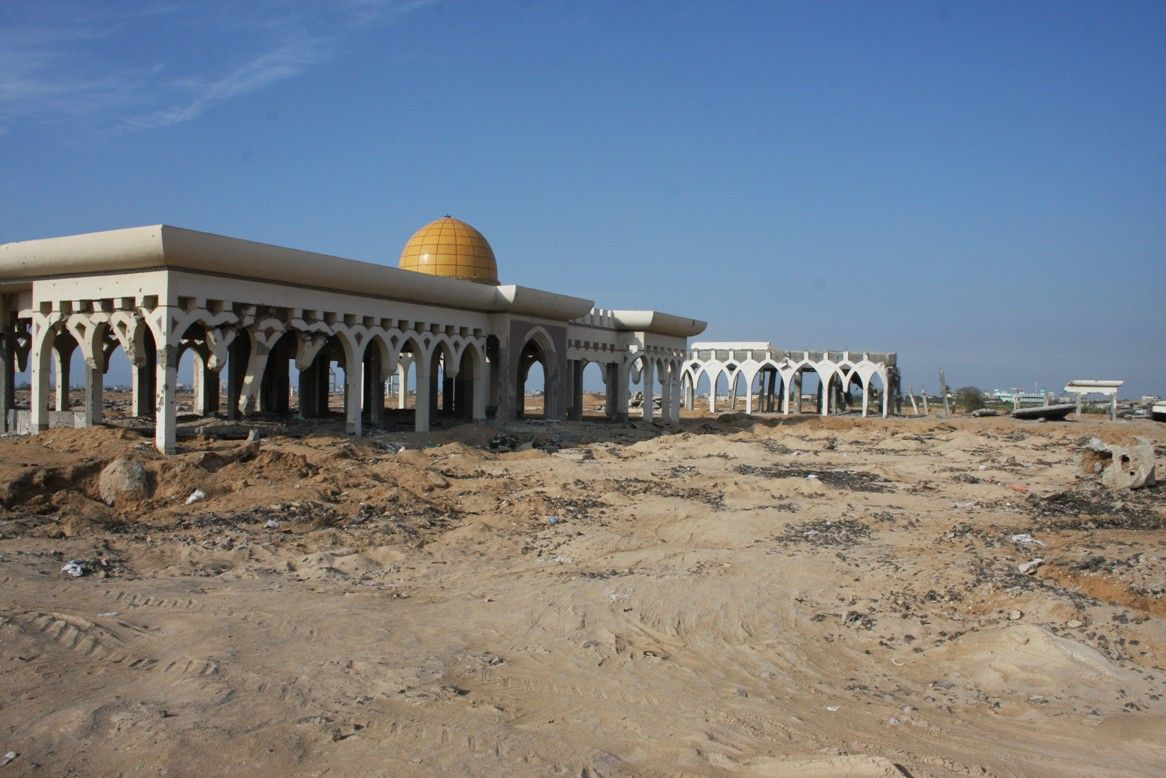
Ruins of the VIP lounge with its gold dome in 2008

The agreement became moot after Hamas won the 2006 Palestinian legislative election and kidnapped an Israeli soldier, Gilad Shalit. The kidnapping sparked a conflict, during which Israel bombed the airport again. Buildings were damaged, including the south wing, which was nearing completion. Palestinian officials stopped protecting the airport. Hamas took over the Gaza Strip the following year, and the Israelis continued to shell the airport during wars with the group. Subsequently, equipment was looted from the site. Gazans also chipped away the runway and terminal to obtain rubble, due to the Israeli blockade of Gaza causing a shortage of building materials.

== Infrastructure ==
The total area of the airport was 450 hectares (1,100 acres). The passenger terminal was able to handle 700,000 passengers per year and was decorated with stone mosaics and Islamic paintings. There was also a VIP lounge with a golden dome, modelled after the Dome of the Rock, as well as a suite for Yasser Arafat. The asphalt runway was designated 01/19 and measured 3,076 by 45 metres (10,092 ft × 148 ft).
