= Netzarim Corridor clashes =

Military engagement in the Gaza Strip

- Part of the Israeli invasion of the Gaza Strip during the Gaza war
- Gaza Strip under Palestinian control Gaza Strip under Israeli control Former occupied territories regained from Israel
Date	30 October 2023 – 10 October 2025 (2 years, 9 months, 3 weeks and 3 days)
Location	Netzarim Corridor, Gaza Strip, Palestine
Result	Israeli withdrawal

Belligerents
Israel	Hamas Palestinian allies: Palestinian Islamic Jihad; Popular Front for the Liberation of Palestine; Democratic Front for the Liberation of Palestine; (Fatah) Al-Aqsa Martyrs' Brigades; Popular Resistance Committees; Palestinian Mujahideen Movement; Palestinian Freedom Movement; Martyr Abdul Qader al Husseini Brigades; Popular Front for the Liberation of Palestine General Command; Iran (on 1 October 2024)

Units involved
Israel Defense Forces; Israeli Ground Forces; Northern Command; 91st Division; Alexandroni Brigade; Southern Command; 252nd Division; Jerusalem Brigade; 8119th Battalion; Harel Brigade; Central Command; 99th Division; Israeli Air Force	List of Palestinian units: (Palestine) Palestinian Joint Operations Room; al-Qassam Brigades; Al-Quds Brigades; Abu Ali Mustafa Brigades; National Resistance Brigades; Al-Aqsa Martyrs' Brigades; Al-Nasser Salah al-Deen Brigades; Mujahideen Brigades; Al-Ansar Brigades; Abdul Qader al Husseini Brigades; Jihad Jibril Brigades; Iranian Armed Forces; Islamic Revolutionary Guard Corps; Aerospace Forces (on 1 October 2024)

Casualties and losses
(Israel) Unknown	(Palestine) Unknown

The Netzarim Corridor clashes between Israel and Hamas-led Palestinian forces occurred during the Gaza war, inside the Gaza Strip. The fighting was centered around the Netzarim Corridor, a road built by the Israel Defense Forces (IDF) which runs through the middle of the Strip and was used for launching military operations against Hamas and its allies.

== Background ==
Netzarim was an Israeli settlement in the Gaza Strip which was built in 1972 and dismantled in 2005 during the Israeli disengagement from the territory. The IDF captured the site of the former settlement during the 2008-2009 Gaza War, which ended with a ceasefire and Israeli withdrawal from the Strip.

The IDF named the present corridor after Netzarim, since it includes the site of the former settlement.

== Course of events ==
=== 2023 ===
The IDF captured the area that would become the Netzarim Corridor during the early stages of its invasion into the Gaza Strip. On 30 October 2023, IDF troops were confirmed to have entered the area of the former Netzarim settlement with infantry and tanks. The next day Hamas claimed its military wing, the Al-Qassam Brigades, attacked IDF vehicles there. However, the first verified Hamas operations at the site of the former Netzarim were on 5 November.

By 6 November, the IDF "had cut an informal, winding track" across the Gaza Strip which reached to the coast. On 24 November, it was reported that the IDF would "continue administrative and logistical movements on the Netzarim axis and coastal road in the northern Gaza Strip". Palestinian Islamic Jihad (PIJ)'s military wing, the Al-Quds Brigades, conducted two separate attacks on the Netzarim Corridor in December 2023.

=== 2024 ===
Completion of the corridor was ultimately finalized between 5 March and 9 March 2024.

From March to April 2024, the two sides clashed regularly in the area. The IDF launched raids into the northern and central Gaza Strip, while Palestinian forces launched multiple artillery and rocket attacks on the Netzarim Corridor. By 7 April, following a series of successive withdrawals from the Gaza Strip, the Netzarim Corridor became the only area where the IDF was deployed.

The Foundation for Defense of Democracies reported on 8 May that the Netzarim Corridor had become "a magnet" for repeated Palestinian attacks, with the Tehran Times reporting a similar observation on 20 July. Nonetheless, the IDF continued military operations from the corridor during this time. One IDF officer reported that troops had consistently found evidence of Palestinian militant activity, such as weapons and explosives, in almost every building searched near the area.

On 17 August, an IED trap set by the Al-Qassam Brigades was triggered in Netzarim. The Israeli army acknowledged 2 soldiers were killed, including a sergeant major.

During the 1 October Iranian airstrikes on Israel, Iran claimed that some missiles they launched hit IDF positions in the Netzarim Corridor. That same day, the IDF repelled an apparent ground attack by dozens of "Palestinian suspects" approaching the corridor. According to Palestinian medical officials, these were Gazan civilians attempting to return to their homes in the northern Gaza Strip.

=== 2025 ===
On 11 January, the Al-Quds Brigades and the Jihad Jibril Brigades of the PFLP-GC attacked an Israeli unit at the Netzarim Corridor.

Israel agreed to gradually withdraw from the Netzarim Corridor as part of a ceasefire agreement with Hamas, which came into effect on 19 January.

On 25 January, Hamas failed to release a hostage scheduled for transfer to Israel under the ceasefire's prisoner exchange. As a result, Israel suspended its planned opening up of the Netzarim Corridor. However, the release of the hostage was later arranged and Israel opened up the western part of the corridor on the morning of 27 January, with large crowds of displaced Gazans returning to the north. The IDF also began withdrawing from the part that was opened. American and Egyptian security contractors, working under an Egyptian-Qatari committee tasked with implementing the ceasefire, began inspecting vehicles moving through the area. Hamas militants were also later seen stationed at the Netzarim Corridor. On 9 February, Israeli forces completed their withdrawal from the remainder of the corridor.

On 19 March, Israel returned and recaptured part of the Netzarim Corridor amid a breakdown of the ceasefire.

On 12 April, the Al-Quds Brigades targeted IDF positions adjacent to the Corridor with a rocket barrage, and seized two Israeli drones, according to footage broadcast by PIJ.

On 1 October, the IDF said it had achieved operational control over the western portion of the Netzarim Corridor, marking the full Israeli recapture of the passage.

On 8 October, the IDF said that Al-Qassam Brigades gunmen had attempted to raid an army encampment near the Corridor, in the southern outskirts of Gaza City, with Israeli forces repelling the attack.

Under the terms of the Gaza war peace plan that went into effect on 10 October 2025, Israeli forces withdrew from the Netzarim Corridor. Thousands of Palestinian civilians passed through the Corridor to their homes in northern Gaza.

== See also ==
- 2025 Gaza City offensive
- 2025 Gaza Strip aid distribution killings
