= Netzarim Junction =

Road intersection in the Gaza Strip

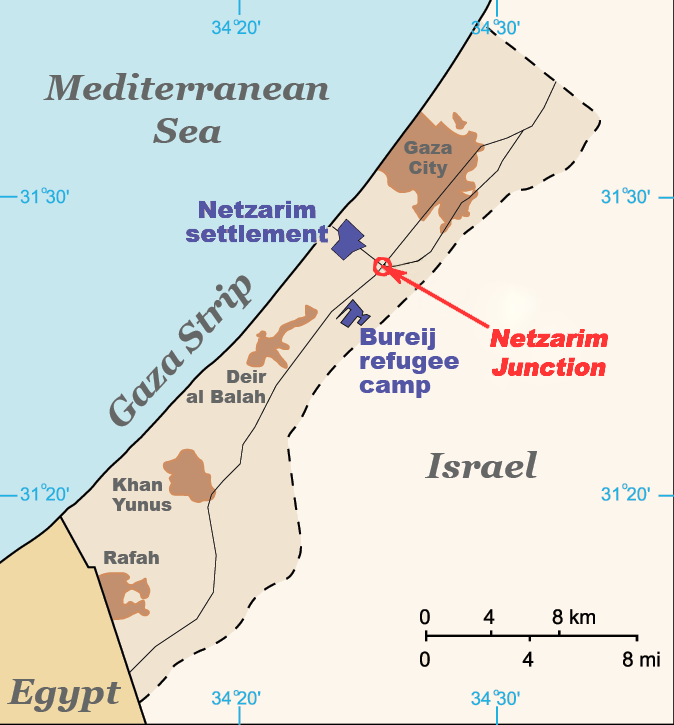
- A map of the junction
- Interactive map of Netzarim Junction

Location
- (Palestine) Gaza Strip
- Coordinates: 31°28′10.6″N 34°25′53.5″E
- Roads at junction: Route 749 (Netzarim Corridor); Salah al-Din Road

Construction
- Type: Road intersection

The Netzarim Junction is a road intersection in the central part of the Gaza Strip. It is formed by the intersection of Route 749 (running east–west, built by the IDF) within the Netzarim Corridor with Salah al-Din Road (running north–south, and one of the Gaza Strip's two main such roads). It was named after the former Israeli settlement of Netzarim.

On November 12, 1994, the Netzarim Junction bicycle bombing occurred. This killed three soldiers, six Israeli servicemen, and six Palestinians. In response, the Palestinian police cracked down and arrested over 100 Islamic militants.

On September 30, 2000, the killing of Muhammad al-Durrah occurred at the junction.

In August 2024, amidst the ongoing Israeli invasion of the Gaza Strip, Israel proposed adding an inspection mechanism to the junction, which the United States rejected.

The junction, as well as all of Salah al-Din Road, was closed by Israeli tanks in March 2025.
