= Abdul Rauf Shaat =

Palestinian journalist (1991–2026)

- عبد الرؤوف شعث
- Born: 1991; Rafah
- Died: 21 January 2026 (aged 34–35); Netzarim Corridor
- Occupation: Journalist

Abdul Rauf Shaat (Arabic: عبد الرؤوف شعث, romanized: Abdul Rauf Shaat, 1991 – 21 January 2026) was a Palestinian freelance photojournalist who worked for AFP until his killing by an Israeli airstrike on 21 January 2026.

== Background ==
Born in Rafah, Shaat was a photo journalist who worked for several local and international media outlets, including Agence France Presse and CBS News. Shaat married 13 days before his death. The marriage produced a son who was born 9 months after his father's death. His family named the son after him to honor his death. Shaat was most prominent for his work covering the Gaza War with AFP, which almost lasted for approximately two years until his death.

== Death ==
On 21 January 2026, Shaat was accompanying Anas Ghoneim and Muhammad Qashta. Anas Ghoneim worked as a freelance photojournalist and drone operator, while Qashta worked as a journalist and spokesperson for the Egyptian Committee for Gaza Relief. They were on assignment to document humanitarian work done by the Egyptian Committee at the Netzarim Camp when they were killed by an Israeli drone strike while driving in their vehicle in the Al-Zahra area southwest of Gaza City. According to reports, the vehicle was a jeep that was clearly marked as a media vehicle. Israel's military said it had spotted suspects who were operating a drone that posed a threat to its troops, and said that that the details of the incident were still under review. The bodies of the three journalists were transported to Al-Aqsa Martyrs Hospital in Deir al-Balah.

=== Response and tributes ===
AFP released a statement expressing immense sadness at the death of Shaat, noting his two years history at the company, and demanding a full and transparent investigation into his death. UNESCO Director-General Khaled El-Enany condemned the killing of Shaat and his colleagues, and also called for a thorough investigation into their deaths. The Foreign Press Association called for an investigation to be made and condemned the killings. The Palestinian Journalists' Syndicate also condemned the killings.
