= Abdul al-Qadir al-Husseini Brigades =

Palestinian Militant group

- Leader: Abu Suhaib Zaqout
- Dates active: 2012–present
- Split from: Al-Aqsa Martyrs' Brigades
- Country: Palestine
- Allegiance: Fatah (until 2023)
- Active regions: Gaza Strip
- Ideology: Palestinian nationalism Socialism
- Size: 700 – 1000 fighters
- Part of: (Palestine) Palestinian Joint Operations Room
- Wars: Israeli–Palestinian conflict; 2021 Israel–Palestine crisis; Gaza war; Netzarim Corridor clashes; Rafah offensive; 2025 Gaza City offensive

The Abdul al-Qadir al-Husseini Brigades (Arabic: كتائب الشهيد عبد القادر الحسيني, romanized: kataib eabd alqadir alhusayni), named after Abdul Qadir al-Husayni, is a Fatah-aligned militant group in the Gaza Strip. The group has a relationship with the Al-Quds Brigades and the Al-Nasser Salah al-Deen Brigades.

== History ==
=== Foundation ===
After Hamas outlawed Fatah's activities in the Gaza Strip in 2007, cofounders of the Al-Aqsa Martyrs' Brigades founded the Abdul al-Qadir al-Husseini Brigades in 2012. Hamas allowed the organization to function without giving it explicit permission.

=== Activities ===
The group participated in the 2021 Israel–Palestine crisis, with two splinter groups from Al-Aqsa Martyrs' Brigades.

==== Gaza war ====
On August 15, 2024, the group along with the Palestinian Islamic Jihad Movement, fired rockets, and targeted Israeli forces in Netzarim Corridor.

On September 28, 2024, the group detonated an Improvised explosive device targeting an armored personnel carrier in Rafah.

On October 3, 2025, the group launched mortar shells at an Israeli command post.
