= Bicycle bomb =

Improvised explosive device placed on a bicycle

Viet Cong bicycle mine/bomb

A bicycle bomb – or bike bomb – is an improvised explosive device (IED); it consists of an explosive charge and an initiation system placed on or inside a bicycle.

== History ==
=== Afghanistan ===
- On 6 December 2003 in the main square of Kandahar at least 15 people were wounded by a bicycle bomb.
- On February 2006 in the city of Kunduz as a result of a bicycle bomb two Afghans were killed and a German Bundeswehr soldier (from ISAF) was injured.
- On 10 October 2006, in Kabul, a bicycle bomb exploded near a police bus, wounding 11 police officers and civilians.

=== Gaza ===
- Netzarim Junction bicycle bombing: A suicide bombing occurred on November 11, 1994, at the Netzarim Junction, an Israeli Army checkpoint located in the Gaza Strip. In the attack, three Israeli soldiers were killed and six Israeli soldiers and six Palestinians were wounded.
- On 19 May 2003 a 19 year-old Hamas militant strapped explosives to the back of his bicycle in the Gaza Strip and rode it alongside an Israeli Army vehicle, detonating it, killing himself and injuring 3 Israeli soldiers.

=== Germany ===
- On 30 November 1989, Alfred Herrhausen, chairman of Deutsche Bank, was killed by a sophisticated bomb – probably an explosively formed penetrator/projectile (EFP) or a platter charge – hidden in a satchel on a bicycle parked beside the route of his bullet-proof Mercedes limousine.

=== India ===
- On 28 January 2003, a bomb exploded near the Vile Perle Station, killing 1 and injuring 25 others.
- Jaipur bombings: In the Indian city of Jaipur a series of seven bomb blasts took place within a span of twelve minutes on 13 May 2008, killing at least 80 people and injuring hundreds more.
- In Ahmedabad, largest city of the state of Gujarat, 45 were killed in a series of 17 blasts which took place within 1 hour on the evening of July 28, 2008.
- In Hyderabad,Telangana on 21 February 2013, two bombs exploded, killing 18 and injuring 131.

=== Iraq ===
- In the Iraqi city of Baqubah according to the police at least 25 people were killed in a bicycle bombing on 26 June 2006.
- August 2009, a bicycle bomb explodes near a restaurant in Baghdad killing two people.

=== Pakistan ===
- A bicycle bomb exploded in a suburb of Quetta on 24 May 2004, wounding 13 police and soldiers travelling in a truck.

=== Russia ===
- On 21 August 2009, in Grozny, Chechnya, alleged suicide bombers approached police checkpoints on bicycles before blowing themselves up, killing and wounding several people.

=== Spain ===
- On 28 June 2001, a parcel bomb planted by the ETA on a bicycle exploded in Madrid, injuring at least 10 people.

=== Sri Lanka ===
- On 30 August 2001 a time bomb tied to a bicycle exploded in the coastal town Kalmunai, killing two policemen and a bystander.

=== United Kingdom ===
- The IRA used bicycle bombs twice in Northern Ireland and once at a British military facility in Germany.
  - 1939 Coventry bombing: On 25 August 1939 an IRA bicycle bomb exploded in Coventry, killing five people. The bomb had been left in the basket of a bicycle.
  - In 1979 a bomb exploded in package carried in a mailbag on a postman's bicycle in Streatley, Berkshire.
  - On 13 August 1994, two bombs were planted in bags placed on bicycles in Brighton and Bognor Regis. The Bognor one detonated damaging shops but no casualties; the Brighton one was defused.
  - No information is available on the bomb detonated at a British military installation in Germany.
- On 8 August 1976, a member of the Parachute Regiment, Private Robert (Bob) Borucki, was killed by the explosion of a bomb planted inside a basket of a bicycle at Crossmaglen. Borucki is buried in the cemetery in the village of Wales, near Rotherham. A year later, a sangar named after the soldier was built on the spot. The facility was removed in the early 2000s as part of the Belfast Agreement.

=== Vietnam ===
- During the Vietnam War, among the various types of IEDs constructed by the Viet Cong there were also bicycle bombs, used as sabotage devices.

== In popular culture ==
- The 1955 novel The Quiet American by Graham Greene describes the use of bicycle bombs in Saigon.
- The movie Charlie Wilson's War mentions the need for bicycle bombs in the Afghanistan resistance of the USSR.
- There is a band called This Bike is a Pipe Bomb, and bicycles bearing the band's stickers have caused false evacuations at airports and universities.
