= Al-Rashid Street =

Al-Rashid Street may refer to:

- Al-Rashid Street, Gaza Strip
- Al-Rashid Street, Baghdad
