= Al-Rashid Street, Gaza Strip =

Main street on the beach in the Gaza Strip

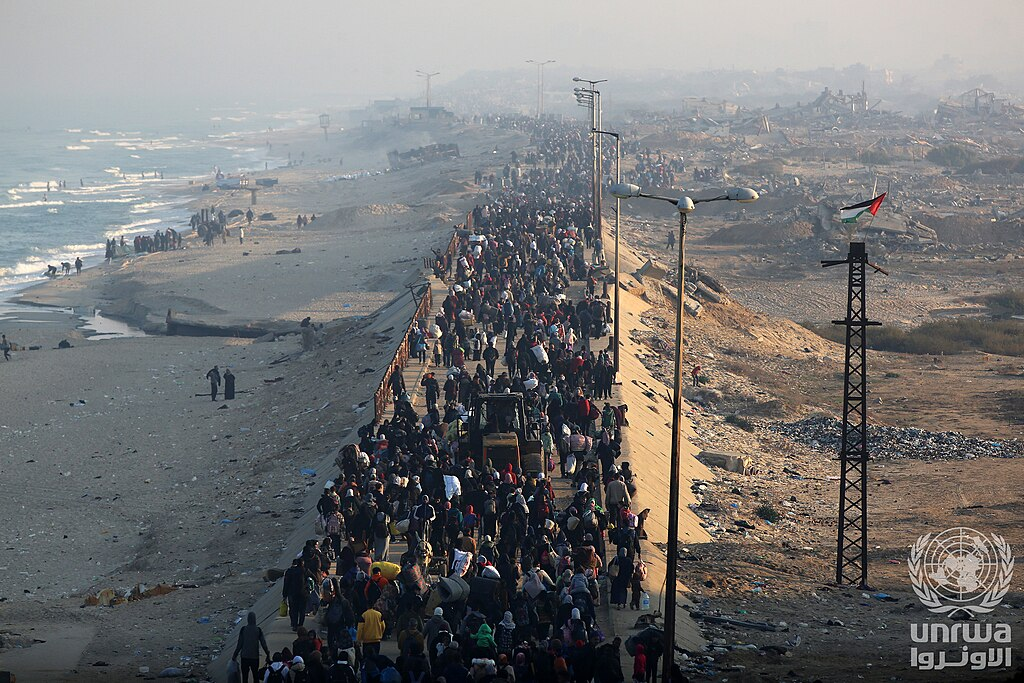
Palestinian internally displaced persons on Al-Rashid Street, near Wadi Besor (2025)

Al-Rashid Street (Note: Arabic: شَارِعُ الرَّشِيدِ, romanized: Šāriʿ al-Rašīd; also known as Al-Rashid Coastal Road, from al-Rashid "the Just", one of the names of God in Islam, roughly meaning "guide on the right path") is one of two main roads through the Gaza Strip. While the Saladin Road runs as the main thoroughfare in the center of the Gaza Strip, the Al-Rashid Street follows the coastline for almost its entire length of approximately 45 km from the Israeli border in the north to just before the Egyptian border, never straying more than two kilometers from the coast. It is also called Gaza's "street that never sleeps". It has been the subject of much shelling since Israel withdrew from the Gaza Strip in 2005.

== Overview ==
In the Six-Day War in 1967, the Gaza Strip along with the Sinai Peninsula was occupied by Israel. The Israeli Defense Forces paved the section connecting Sheikh Ijlin to Wadi Gaza in November 1971.

Al-Rashid Street, along with Salah al-Din Street, which also runs north–south but is located inland to the east, make up the two main arteries of the Gaza Strip. Running along the Mediterranean coast for the most part, it is a scenic road lined with hotels, restaurants, cafes, and shops, and is a bustling street. It is also dotted with beaches, connecting the road with places for swimming, leisure, and relaxation.

The Port of Gaza, a strategic commercial, military and transport hub, is also located in the northern part of the Gaza Strip along Al-Rashid Street.

Numerous landmarks and ruins are dotted along the road, including the Al-Hassaina Mosque, known for its elegant architecture and twin minarets, located on the waterfront of this road overlooking Gaza Port. Also in the north, the Al-Khalidi Mosque in the Al-Shati refugee camp, also boasting elegant modern architecture and twin minarets, is a recently built mosque that has gained increasing religious importance among local Muslims. In the center, the ruins of the Monastery of St. Hilarion at Tell Umm Amer, which is on the Tentative List of World Heritage Sites status, have been excavated near the road. The privately owned Gaza Archaeological Museum was also located on this road until its destruction in 2023.

A map of the Gaza Strip by the OCHA. The southern portion of Al-Rashid Street is named Coastal Road and Yasser Arafat.

== Activity ==
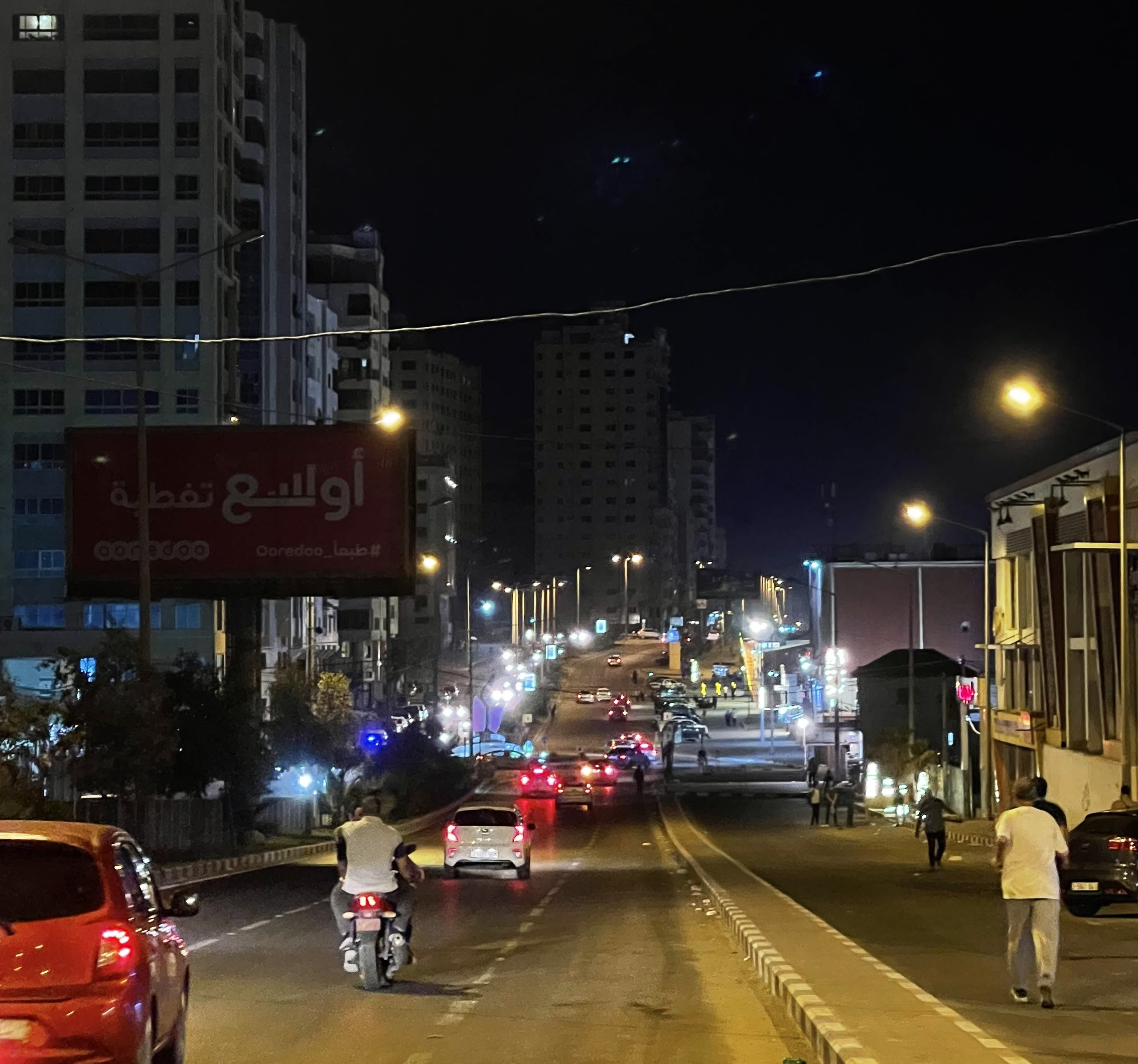
Al-Rashid Street in Gaza City, at night, July 2022

For much of its length, the road served as a coastal promenade, connecting local hotels and resorts to the wider road network and linking them to other tourist destinations and the city of Gaza. Destroyed in four wars since 2006, the road was rebuilt by 2015 at a cost of nearly $30 million, funded by the Qatari government, and equipped with solar panels to compensate for frequent power outages. At night, it was bustling with life, featuring restaurants, cafes, and street vendors. For many residents, this section of the road within Gaza City, especially during the frequent power outages, provided a welcome respite from daily worries and psychological stress. It also connects to the port of Gaza, a strategic hub for trade, military operations, and transportation.

Many people who had lost their homes to years of Israeli airstrikes were staying with their families and relatives, so there were many people living in the houses. Some people gathered on Al-Rashid Street to escape the "packed" buildings, and some even slept on the beach along the street. Young people also gathered on this street with their friends.

According to the public relation manager of Gaza, in 2017, around 10,000 people gather on Al-Rashid Street every day.

== Reconstruction project ==
When Israel invaded Gaza in 2014, Al-Rashid Street was also affected by attacks. However, the following year, in 2015, with financial support from former Qatari prime minister Hamad bin Khalifa Al-Thani, Al-Rashid Street was rebuilt. Solar panels were installed along the street, ensuring a constant supply of electricity even during power outages. The reconstruction project included a wide range of infrastructure improvements, including waterworks, sewerage, road construction, electrical work, communications work, traffic work, road painting, safety work, and agricultural work.

== Gaza war ==
When the Gaza war began in 2023, the Israel Defense Forces ordered residents of the northern Gaza Strip to evacuate to the southern part of the Strip. Initially, Salah al-Din Street was designated as the evacuation route in many cases, but as the war progressed, Al-Rashid Street came to be designated as the evacuation route.

Air strikes and ground attacks on Al-Rashid Street destroyed landmarks along the road, including the Gaza Port, Al-Hassaina Mosque, and Al-Khalidi Mosque, and also caused extensive damage to apartment buildings, commercial buildings, and the road itself. The asphalt was stripped away from the road, leaving the soil exposed, and Al-Hassaina Mosque reduced to rubble, its dome lying on the ground. Al-Hassaina Mosque, like the Great O'Malley Mosque in the Old City, is a place of great religious and spiritual importance for Gazans who, due to the Israeli blockade, are unable to make the pilgrimage to Muslim holy sites such as Mecca and Al-Aqsa Mosque, where many Gazans visit for taraweeh prayers during Ramadan. The news of the destruction of the mosque came as a shock to Gazans, as Al-Rashid Street was a popular gathering place for many people. Once the northern Gaza Strip was "controlled", humanitarian aid supplies to the northern residents were primarily delivered via Al-Rashid Street. The Israeli military also constructed Military Road 749, which runs east–west through the Gaza Strip from Al-Rashid Street to the Israeli border, dividing the Gaza Strip into northern, central, and southern parts. Outposts and checkpoints were set up at the intersections of Al-Rashid Street and Road 749 to restrict the flow of people and goods.

== Flour Massacre ==
Reports of hunger and famine in the Gaza Strip led to large crowds gathering on Al-Rashid Street day and night, particularly in the north where supplies were scarce, waiting for trucks carrying relief supplies to enter the north through checkpoints.

On February 29, 2024, as a flour delivery truck exited a checkpoint, people flocked to the truck in search of supplies, coming under gunfire and artillery fire, killing at least 112 and wounding over 760. The Israeli military responded by stating that the crowds were causing chaos and that they had fired on "several individuals" threatening its forces. However, most of the casualties taken to hospitals had gunshot wounds, and samples of 200 casualties were found to contain 5.56x45mm NATO ammunition, specifically FMJ (Full Metal Jacket) rounds manufactured between 2020 and 2022 and licensed and exported to the Israeli military by the United Kingdom. A CNN analysis also estimated that the rate of fire was 600 rounds per minute. After February 29 of the same year, crowds continued to gather on Al-Rashid Street to wait for the delivery trucks, resulting in further gunfire and casualties.

== World Central Kitchen aid convoy attack ==
On April 1, 2024, three vehicles belonging to the humanitarian NGO World Central Kitchen (WCK) were hit by an Israeli drone while driving through a "no-fire zone" on Al-Rashid Street after delivering aid to a warehouse in Deir al-Balah, despite prior coordination with the Israeli military. Seven staff members were killed. The dead included an Australian, a Polish, a British national, a dual US-Canadian citizen, and a Palestinian. This led to widespread international criticism and the suspension of aid activities by WCK and its partner non-profit organizations. Although the Israeli army admitted to "grave mistakes" and announced the dismissal of the two officers, WCK CEO Erin Gore said the army "cannot credibly investigate its own failure in Gaza" and called for an independent, third-party investigation. UN Secretary-General Antonio Guterres also called for an independent investigation.

== See also ==
- Al Deira Hotel
