= Netzarim Junction bicycle bombing =

Suicide bombing attack in Palestine in 1994

- The attack site
- Native name: פיגוע ההתאבדות בצומת נצרים (1994)
- Location: 31°27′55″N 34°25′36″E; Netzarim Junction, Gaza Strip
- Date: 11 November 1994; 31 years ago c. 13:40 pm (UTC+2)
- Attack type: Suicide attack
- Deaths: 3 Israeli soldiers (+1 bomber)
- Injuries: 6 Israeli soldiers and 6 Palestinian Arabs
- Perpetrator: Islamic Jihad claimed responsibility
- Assailant: Hisham Ismail Hamad
- No. of participants: 1

The Netzarim Junction bicycle bombing was a suicide bombing which occurred on 11 November 1994, at the Netzarim Junction, an Israeli Army checkpoint located in the Gaza Strip. In the attack, three Israeli soldiers were killed and six Israeli soldiers and six Palestinians were wounded.

The Islamic Jihad claimed responsibility for the attack.

== Attack ==
On Friday, November 11, 1994, a Palestinian cyclist detonated explosives strapped to his body as he rode his bicycle into an Israeli Army checkpoint. Apart from the bomber, the blast killed three Israeli soldiers, all officers on reserve duty, and wounded twelve other people – six Israeli servicemen and six Palestinians, including members of a family that happened to be passing in a car.

The attack occurred close to the then Israeli settlement of Netzarim, at the main junction of Gaza Strip's north-south highway.

== Perpetrators ==
A leaflet that was later distributed by Islamic Jihad identified the bomber as Hisham Ismail Hamad, 21, of Gaza City's Sheik Radwan neighborhood.

== Aftermath ==
Palestine Liberation Organization Chairman Yasser Arafat condemned the attack, through an aide. Following the attack, the Palestinian police raided scores of houses and a mosque and arrested more than 100 Islamic militants in a crackdown ordered as a result of the killing of the three Israeli soldiers.

While apparently initiating a tougher policy against Muslim militants, leaders of the Palestinian self-rule authority denounced Netzarim and the other settlements in the Gaza Strip. "Netzarim has been a sore point," said Nabil Shaath, the Palestinian Authority's chief negotiator. Another official, Yasser Abed Rabbo, said, "The settlements represent a time bomb, and we think that in order to overcome many difficulties on the security level, this issue must be resolved, and resolved soon".
