= March 2025 Israeli attacks on the Gaza Strip =

Military offensive that ended the January 2025 Gaza war ceasefire

- Part of the Gaza war
- Type: Airstrikes, artillery/missile barrage
- Location: Gaza Strip
- Planned by: Israel
- Target: Issam al-Da'alis and other Hamas leaders (per Israel); Indiscriminate bombing of the Gaza Strip (per B'Tselem, Al Jazeera, Colombia)
- Date: 18 March 2025; 16 months ago 2:30 a.m. (UTC+2)
- Executed by: Israel Defense Forces; Israeli Air Force; Israeli Ground Forces; Israeli Navy
- Outcome: End of the Gaza war ceasefire
- Casualties: 855+ killed 1,869+ wounded

In the early hours of 18 March 2025, Israel launched a surprise attack on the Gaza Strip, effectively ending the January 2025 Gaza war ceasefire. Israel's missile and artillery attack killed more than 400 Palestinians, including 263 women and children according to the Gaza Health Ministry, making it one of the deadliest in the Gaza war. Codenamed Operation Might and Sword (Hebrew: מבצע עוז וחרב, Mivtza Oz VaḤerev) by the Israel Defense Forces (IDF), it was carried out in coordination with the United States. The next day, the Israeli military announced that it was conducting a ground offensive to retake the Netzarim Corridor, from which it had withdrawn in February.

On 17 January, Israel and Hamas agreed to a 42-day ceasefire. Under the agreement, all Israeli hostages would be released by the end of the second phase and the Gaza war would permanently end. After the first phase ended on 1 March, Hamas intended to move to the second phase of negotiations – as envisioned in the original ceasefire deal – while Benjamin Netanyahu and the Trump administration insisted on renegotiating the overall terms. Israel also refused to withdraw from sites in the Gaza Strip, despite the fact that it had agreed to do so in the ceasefire agreement. Furthermore, Israel killed more than 140 Palestinians in the Gaza Strip during the ceasefire, and prevented all food and medicine from entering Gaza from March; it later shut off electricity to the Gaza Strip's main desalination plant, effectively cutting off water. These actions have been deemed war crimes by aid organizations and human rights organizations, including Médecins Sans Frontières and Amnesty International.

The Israeli military's renewed offensive from 18 March affected large parts of the Gaza Strip, including Gaza City, Khan Yunis, and Rafah, and killed more than 591 people, mostly women and children. The airstrikes struck homes and set at least one tent camp on fire. Hospitals were overwhelmed by dead and wounded. Israel's government stated that the strikes targeted leadership figures, mid-ranking military commanders, and the operational infrastructure of Hamas, such as Issam al-Da'alis. This has been disputed by experts such as Miranda Cleland of Defence for Children International and Spanish foreign minister José Manuel Albares, who believe Israel "indiscriminately attacked" the Gaza Strip. Several Palestinian families were killed en masse as a result of the attacks.

Hamas condemned the strikes as a violation of the ceasefire, accusing Israel of endangering the remaining Israeli hostages. It began responding militarily to the Israeli strikes on 20 March, when it fired rockets at Tel Aviv. The Israeli government said it carried out the attack in response to Hamas' refusal to extend a ceasefire through additional hostage releases. Hamas had agreed to the second phase of the original ceasefire agreement, under which Israeli hostages would have been released in exchange for a permanent end to the Gaza war. The Israeli government did not consider its attack to be a breach of the ceasefire agreement, arguing that there was "no automaticity" between the phases. The escalation drew large-scale international attention, with the United Nations Security Council convening an emergency session to address the crisis.

== Background ==
In mid-January 2025, a ceasefire between Israel and Hamas took effect, pausing the Gaza war. The terms of the ceasefire deal included three phases: the first phase involved a limited exchange of over 1,500 Palestinian prisoners for 25 living and 8 dead Israeli hostages, as well as increased aid into the Gaza Strip. The second phase would complete the release of the hostages and mark the end of the war. The third phase would involve the reconstruction of the Gaza Strip. The details of the second phase were to be negotiated, but the Biden administration had made it clear that the first phase of the ceasefire would continue until the second phase could be agreed upon. Despite the ceasefire, the Israel Defense Forces have carried out strikes on the Gaza Strip that have killed over 150 people, including many children. The UN condemned the strikes, and Amnesty International said Israel is committing genocide in Gaza.

Instead of continuing to the second phase of the ceasefire per the original agreement, Israel proposed a new plan (called the "Witkoff plan" after Steve Witkoff), in which Hamas would release the Israeli captives in exchange for a 50-day extension of the ceasefire. Hamas rejected this new proposal, which differed from the terms agreed in January. (Note: Per NPR: "Israel has been pushing for a new plan outside of the original agreement, a plan which Hamas has rebuffed. [...] Just to be clear, this new plan is not the deal that both sides agreed to originally. [...] Now Israel has introduced this whole new plan, the Witkoff plan. It's important to note that Hamas has not outright rejected it, but it isn't embracing it, either." Per CBS: "Under the proposal, Israel had demanded Hamas immediately hand over half of the remaining hostages held in Gaza, which would have been a significant change in the terms initially agreed to under the deal brokered by the U.S., Qatar and Egypt." Per Al Jazeera: "The siege began on March 2 after Israel reneged on the ceasefire deal and sought to extend the first stage of the three-phased agreement that expired last week, without committing to ending the war on Gaza.") CBS News writes that some of Trump's and Netanyahu's proposals also contradicted the terms of the Gaza ceasefire deal. Hamas insisted on the full implementation of the ceasefire deal agreed upon in January.

The Israeli government and the United States insisted on renegotiating the original ceasefire deal. Israel cast Hamas's preference for sticking to original deal as a "refusal" to extend the ceasefire. Israel's new proposal was to extend the original ceasefire in exchange for more prisoner-hostage exchanges; however, this extension was not part of the January ceasefire agreement. US National Security Council spokesman asserted that Hamas "could have released hostages to extend the ceasefire but instead chose refusal and war."

According to Palestinian officials, the Israel Defense Forces violated the ceasefire hundreds of times, carrying out strikes on the Gaza Strip that had killed over 100 people. Among those killed, they said, were "civilians who were collecting firewood or checking on their homes". On the other hand, Netanyahu and Israeli officials have claimed that Hamas violated the ceasefire several times by using hostages for rituals and propaganda. In addition, Gideon Sa'ar, Israel's foreign minister, claimed, without providing evidence, that Hamas has violated the agreement by seizing aid supplies for itself. Hamas has denied this allegation.

On 2 March, shortly after the beginning of Ramadan, the Islamic month of fasting, Israel shut down the entry of all humanitarian aid (including food and fuel) into the Gaza Strip. A few days later, Israel cut off the electricity supply to Gaza Strip's main desalination plant, which provided drinking water for 500,000 Palestinians. Amnesty International said that shutting off all food and water indicated Israel had a policy of imposing conditions of life calculated to bring about the destruction of the Palestinian people – which is tantamount to genocide. Médecins Sans Frontières said depriving Palestinians of drinking water was a war crime.

On 17 and 18 March, Israeli officials stated that Palestinian militants, including Hamas, were building up their military capabilities and preparing for offensives against Israeli communities and Israeli soldiers in Gaza. Israel did not provide any evidence for these claims. Hamas denied these allegations.

=== Israeli domestic politics ===
Israeli Prime Minister Benjamin Netanyahu faced pressure from far-right members of his coalition to resume war against the Gaza Strip. Throughout the war, members of Netanyahu's coalition have called for the permanent conquest of Gaza and re-establishment of Jewish settlements there. Netanyahu has thus far resisted those calls, and when he signed the ceasefire agreement in January, the Israeli Security Minister Itamar Ben-Gvir left Netanyahu's coalition. After Israel attacked Gaza on 18 March, Ben-Gvir rejoined the coalition. Opposition members accused Netanyahu and his government of failing to eliminate Hamas and allied groups' military capabilities or to rescue the remaining Israeli hostages in Gaza.

Netanyahu's critics have said that the 18 March attacks are a result of Netanyahu's legal troubles. Netanyahu was scheduled on 18 March to testify in his corruption trial, but as a result of the attacks, the legal proceedings were postponed.

=== Proposed expulsion of Palestinians from the Gaza Strip ===
On 4 February 2025, Trump announced an intention to "take over" and "own" the Gaza Strip. Trump proposed that Gaza's 2 million Palestinians be permanently relocated from the Strip. This plan was supported by Netanyahu but condemned by human rights experts as a violation of international law. The 18 March attacks were done with Trump's approval.

The Israeli Nachala organization had repeatedly called for Netanyahu to defeat Hamas and expel Palestinians from the Gaza Strip.

== Attacks ==
=== 18 March ===
The attacks began on 18 March 2025, at approximately 02:20 local time during the Islamic holy month of Ramadan. Following a ceasefire instituted around two months prior, the Israeli strikes of 18 March 2025 were a surprise attack, with the Israeli military stating that their attack "plan was kept in closed circles in the IDF to create an element of surprise and deception."

Israeli warplanes began entering Gaza at 02:30, and the Israel Defense Forces announced on Telegram that it and the Israeli Security Agency were "conducting extensive strikes on terror targets belonging to the Hamas terrorist organization in the Gaza Strip". According to the Associated Press, Israeli prime minister Benjamin Netanyahu ordered the strikes after ceasefire talks appeared to stall. The strikes have targeted Rafah, Khan Yunis, Deir al-Balah, Nuseirat, Bureij, Al-Zaytoun, Al-Karama, and Beit Hanoun, according to the IDF. Al Jazeera reported strikes in Al-Mawasi, Rafah.

An unidentified Israeli military official stated to Reuters that they would continue the attacks indefinitely, and would incorporate further military elements beyond airstrikes.

An Al Jazeera reporter in Gaza stated that heavy shelling from Israeli tanks targeted eastern sections of Abasan, Khan Yunis. Six family members travelling in a car in Abasan were killed in one of the strikes. The shelling reportedly killed thirteen people. One strike in Rafah reportedly killed seventeen members of a single family. The Al-Tabi'in School in Gaza City, which was sheltering refugees at the time of the attacks, was struck, causing segments of the building to collapse. A Gaza City prison in the Al-Shati refugee camp was hit in an airstrike, collapsing the building and killing over thirty-six prisoners and prison guards.

=== 19 March ===
The attacks continued at 6 p.m. into the early hours of 19 March. Israel launched attacks on Rafah and Khan Yunis, killing fourteen people and killing a mother and her child sheltering in a tent encampment. A strike against a five-story tall residential structure in northwestern Gaza City reportedly resulted in the building's complete collapse. Gaza's Civil Defence estimated that thirty people were in the building at the time of the strike, and pulled out three bodies and one survivor with critical injuries. Heavy artillery fire was reported in eastern Gaza City. According to an official of the UN, a UN guesthouse was hit by a non-accidental strike. Israel denied reports of targeting the building.

=== 20 March ===
In the early morning hours of 20 March, Israel launched several attacks on the Gaza Strip, reportedly killing at least 80 Palestinians. Areas where attacked were launched included Bani Suheila, Abasan al-Kabira, al-Fukhari, Mosbeh, and Beit Lahia, resulting in at least eleven residential structures being "flattened". Many of the areas hit were family residences, resulting in the deaths of women, children, newborn infants, and men who had been sleeping at the time of the attacks. The Gaza Health Ministry stated that the number of deaths rose to 591 since 18 March, with 1,042 reported injuries.

Hamas responded by firing rockets at Tel Aviv, explaining that it did not respond to the Israeli strikes immediately after they started to give mediators time to pressure Israel to cease its attacks, but decided to "give indications that it can respond" as the assault and death toll increased. Israel claimed that the three rockets were either intercepted or fell in open areas, inflicting no casualties.

=== 21 March ===
Israeli airstrikes bombed the only specialized cancer hospital in the Gaza Strip, the Turkish-Palestinian Friendship Hospital. The Gaza Civil Defense reported that 11 were killed in Israeli attacks. Hamas fired barrages of rockets on Ashkelon in response to Israel's "massacres against civilians" in the Gaza Strip.

=== Ground operations ===
On 18 March, the IDF initiated a "focused ground operation" in central Gaza with the intention of expanding the area of a buffer zone and to re-take the Netzarim Corridor bisecting the Gaza Strip. On 19 March, the IDF announced the operation publicly, and partially recaptured the center of the Netzarim Corridor. The re-capture of the corridor prevented the movement of Palestinians between the northern and southern sections of the Gaza Strip. On 20 March, Israeli forces resumed the Rafah offensive without warning the residents of Rafah.

=== Humanitarian convoy attacks ===
On 23 March 2025, the Israel Defense Forces (IDF) attacked several humanitarian vehicles, including five ambulances, a fire truck, and a United Nations vehicle, in Al-Hashashin area in southern Rafah, Gaza Strip. The massacre resulted in the deaths of 15 aid workers, including eight members of the Palestine Red Crescent Society, five civil defense, and one UN agency employee. It was not until 30 March that most of the missing bodies were retrieved from a mass grave in Rafah, although one ambulance officer who was initially declared missing was kept under Israeli custody.

Initially the IDF spokesperson Nadav Shoshani stated that the IDF had targeted the convoy when "several uncoordinated vehicles were identified advancing suspiciously toward IDF troops without headlights or emergency signals". However, video footage uncovered from the phone of one of the victims contradicted the IDF's statements. Two survivors were detained and stated they were assaulted by the IDF. The International Federation of Red Cross and Red Crescent Societies (IFRC) condemned the attacks, stating that they were the "single most deadly" for its workers in almost a decade. All the murdered medical and civil defence workers were found wearing identifying uniforms or volunteer vests of their respective organisations.

== Blockade on humanitarian supplies ==
Before, during and after the strikes, Israel implemented a total blockade on all humanitarian supplies, including food, water, medications and medical supplies, cooking materials, and other essential goods. Several requests made by the United Nations Security Council to collect and distribute aid left at the Karem Shalom border crossing were "systematically denied". In addition, Israel cut off power to the desalination plant in southern Gaza, restricting the availability of clean water for about 600,000 people. The blockade on commercial goods led to surging prices of staple foods, with prices for vegetables tripling in North Gaza and at least six World Food Programme-subsidized bakeries being forced to close as a result of lacking cooking supplies and gas.

On 19 March, OCHA reported that Israel had blocked medical equipment from entering into Gaza, including 20 ventilators for neonatal intensive care units and nine portable newborn incubators.

In addition, Israel initiated movement restrictions against Palestinians at almost 1,000 roadblocks and checkpoints in the West Bank. The restrictions reportedly forced civilians to make hazardous detours or wait for several hours in queue, significantly impacting the operations of businesses in the West Bank.

== Casualties ==
On 18 March, it was reported that at least 413 people were killed, including 174 children. The Gaza Health Ministry reported that more than 560 people were injured due to the attacks. Of the 404 fatalities, 263 of those killed were women and children. The high death toll made the 18 March attacks one of the deadliest days for Palestinians since the Gaza war's beginning in October 2023. By 20 March, the casualty toll rose to 591 dead and 1,042 injured.

The Gaza Strip's Government Media Office stated that most of the casualties were women, the elderly, and children; reporting that "entire families" had been killed. The office said that the attacks were tactically designed to destroy the will of the Gazan population, and urged the international community to stop the attacks and hold Israeli officials accountable.

An Israeli airstrike on the United Nations headquarters in Gaza City killed one Bulgarian national and injured four other people.

Issam al-Da'alis, whose position is akin to the Prime Minister of Gaza, was killed in the attacks on 18 March. Other government officials killed included: Mahmoud Abu Watfa (undersecretary of the Interior Ministry of the Gaza Strip), Bahjat Abu Sultan (chief of internal security), and Ahmed Omar al-Hatta (undersecretary of the Justice Ministry of the Gaza Strip). Palestinian Islamic Jihad spokesman Abu Hamza was also killed in the airstrikes. In addition, Hamas also reported the deaths of Yasser Harb, M. Muhammad al-Jamasi, Salah al-Bardawil, and Ismail Barhoum, members of its political bureau. The Popular Resistance Committees announced the death of Muhammad al-Batran, commander of its artillery unit and a member of its Central Military Brigade Council. On 27 March, an Israeli airstrike on a tent in Jabalia killed Hamas spokesman Abdel-Latif al-Qanoua.

Muhammad Abu Salmiya, the director of the al-Shifa Hospital, reported that during the emergency response to the attacks, an injured victim died "every minute" in the hospital due to a lack of healthcare supplies. He stated that between Gaza City and North Gaza, only four intensive care beds were available, and that attempts to reach injured victims beneath the rubble were "extremely difficult".

Over seventy people were reported injured in central Gaza.

== Aftermath ==
=== Forced displacement ===
The IDF ordered all civilians in the areas of eastern Gaza to leave and move towards its center. Evacuation orders were issued in areas such as Beit Hanoun in North Gaza, Abasan al-Kabira, Abasan al-Saghira, and Khuza'a in Khan Yunis.

=== Gaza responses ===
The Education Ministry in the Gaza Strip ordered the suspension of classes in dozens of schools.

Local anti-Hamas protests driven by war exhaustion erupted in the North Gaza Governorate on 25 March.

== Reactions ==
The regional mediators intensified diplomatic efforts to broker a renewed truce. The US reaffirmed Israel's right to self-defense and attributed responsibility to Hamas for the failure to extend the ceasefire through hostage negotiations. The White House released a statement saying that Hamas and other regional entities "will see a price to pay," reiterating that "All hell will break loose."

=== Palestine ===
Hamas official Izzat al-Risheq stated that "Netanyahu's decision to resume war" was "a decision to sacrifice the occupation's prisoners and impose a death sentence on them". A senior official of Hamas stated to Reuters that the renewed attacks represented Israel's unilateral termination of the ceasefire started in 19 January. Palestinian Islamic Jihad (PIJ) characterized Israel as "deliberately sabotaging all efforts to reach a ceasefire" to restart its "war of extermination" on Gaza. The paramilitary group called Netanyahu's cabinet a "bloodthirsty Nazi government", and vowed that the cabinet will fail to achieve their objectives. Hamas official Taher al-Nunu described the attacks as a "moral test" for the international community, based on whether it would allow the bombardments on civilians to go on, or if it acted to stop the violence towards Palestinian civilians. Hamas fired rockets at Tel Aviv on 20 March, explaining that it did not immediately respond to the strikes in order to give mediators more time to pressure Israel to cease its attacks, but then decided to "give indications that it can respond" as the assault and death toll rose.

=== Israel ===
==== Government and Politicians ====
Israeli defense minister Israel Katz said that Israel has "returned to fighting in Gaza". He further stated that if Hamas did not release all held captives in Palestinian territory, that Israel would open the "gates of hell" on Gaza, and would discharge forces that Hamas "have never known before". Israel indefinitely shut down the Rafah Border Crossing during the attacks.

Prime Minister of Israel Benjamin Netanyahu's office released a statement on X, claiming that Hamas persistently refused to release Israeli hostages kidnapped during the October 7 attacks while rejecting all proposals offered by mediators and United States Special Envoy to the Middle East Steve Witkoff.

Foreign Minister of Israel Gideon Sa'ar stated that Israel was given "no choice" but to break the ceasefire agreement due to stalling negotiations and the cessation of hostage returns by Hamas in the two and a half weeks prior to the attacks. He described the situation as a "deadlock" where "nothing would move" without further action. He also stated that the military operation initiated by the strikes would not be limited to a single day.

==== Families of hostages ====
Israeli relatives of hostages held in Gaza criticized Netanyahu for breaking the ceasefire, accusing him of endangering their loved ones.

=== International ===
- Australia — Prime Minister Anthony Albanese stated after the attacks in Gaza that "There's already been enormous suffering there, which is why we're calling upon all parties to respect the ceasefire and hostage deal that was put in place," he further stated that "We'll continue to make representations. Australia will continue to stand up for peace and security in the region".
- Bangladesh — The Ministry of Foreign Affairs strongly condemned Israel's renewed military aggression in Gaza, stating, "This has caused extensive civilian casualties, particularly among women and children, and further deteriorated the humanitarian situation." Bangladesh further urged Israel to stop military actions, follow international law, and called on the UN and global community to act swiftly to end violence, protect civilians, and ensure aid reaches Gaza.
- Belgium — Foreign Minister Maxime Prevot stated on Twitter, calling for both parties to implement the second phase of the agreement, "which must pave the way for reconstruction and peace for all", further condemning the "new Israeli strikes and their heavy human toll", adding that Israel's blocking of humanitarian aid to Palestinians was "a serious violation of international law".
- Chile — The Chilean government condemned the "brutal attack against the civilian population of Gaza" and called for a ceasefire.
- China — Ministry of Foreign Affairs spokesperson Mao Ning said Beijing was "highly concerned" about the attacks, calling for parties to avoid any actions "that could lead to an escalation of the situation, and prevent a larger-scale humanitarian disaster".
- Colombia — The Colombian government condemned the "indiscriminate" attack, saying it "jeopardized" the ceasefire, which Colombia urged to be maintained.
- Egypt — The Egyptian government which is acting as a mediator alongside Qatar and the US, called the Israeli attacks a "flagrant violation" of the deal with the foreign ministry calling the attacks a "dangerous escalation which threatens to have bring serious about consequences for the stability of the region".
- France — The foreign ministry condemned the attacks, calling for "an immediate end to hostilities, which are jeopardizing efforts to free the hostages and threatening the lives of the civilian population in Gaza". During a meeting with Jordanian King Abdullah II, President Emmanuel Macron called the attacks a "dramatic step backwards".
- Germany — Foreign Minister Annalena Baerbock said the Israeli attacks is a "cause for great concern", further stated that "The images of burning tents in refugee camps are shocking. Fleeing children and internally displaced persons must never be used as leverage in negotiations".
- Iran — A Foreign Ministry spokesperson stated the US had direct responsibility for "the continuation of genocide in the occupied Palestinian territories".
- Ireland — Prime Minister Micheál Martin condemned the Israeli attacks on Gaza and called on all parties to respect the ceasefire and the agreement to release hostages and return to negotiations "for the sake of all the civilians in Gaza, who have already endured unimaginable hardships, there must be an urgent end to all hostilities".
- India — The official spokesperson of the Ministry of External Affairs, Randhir Jaiswal, said, "We are concerned about the situation in Gaza. It is essential that all hostages are freed. We also call for the sustained supply of humanitarian assistance to the people of Gaza."
- Italy — Prime Minister Giorgia Meloni said the Israeli attacks on Gaza put the prospect of a deal to release the captives at risk, during her speech on the Italian senate she said that "We are following with great concern the resumption of fighting in Gaza... which jeopardizes the objectives we are all working towards: the release of all hostages and a permanent end to hostility, as well as the restoration of full humanitarian assistance in the Strip.
- Jordan — Government spokesman Mohammad al-Momani said that Jordan has been following Israel's "aggressive and barbaric bombing of the Gaza Strip" and understands the need to stop it. During a meeting with French president Macron in Paris, King Abdullah II has called the attacks and the blockade of humanitarian aid a "dangerous escalation" that could threaten the lives of civilians.
- Malaysia — Prime Minister Anwar Ibrahim condemned the air strike that killed aid workers from Malaysian Consultative Council of Islamic Organisations (MAPIM) who were carrying out a humanitarian mission in Gaza.
- Netherlands — Foreign Minister Caspar Veldkamp stated on Twitter that "all hostilities must end permanently", he stated that all parties should "respect the terms of the Gaza ceasefire and hostage deal. All civilians must be protected," and added that "We urge all parties to implement it in full: the remaining hostages must be released, humanitarian aid must reach those in need."
- Norway — Prime Minister Jonas Gahr Støre said the Israeli attacks were "a great tragedy" for the people of Gaza. Saying that "They are almost without protection. Many of them live in tents and on the ruins of what has been destroyed".
- Poland — The Foreign ministry stated that "Poland deplores the renewed hostilities and civilian casualties from Israeli airstrikes in Gaza Strip", urging all parties to implement the ceasefire and enable the release of all hostages.
- Qatar — The Foreign ministry condemned the attack and warning in a statement that Israel's "escalating policies will ultimately ignite the region and undermine its security and stability".
- Russia — Kremlin spokesman Dmitry Peskov warned of a "spiral of escalation" in the wake of the Israeli attacks.
- Saudi Arabia — The foreign ministry stated that the country voiced its condemnation and denunciation "in the strongest terms of the Israeli occupation forces' resumption of aggression ... and their direct bombardment of areas populated by unarmed civilians".
- South Africa — The Department of International Relations and Cooperation released a statement condemning the attacks, noting that "South Africa is gravely concerned by the military onslaught, and the fact that millions of people in Gaza are facing severe food and water shortages as Israel continues to block aid and cut off energy supplies to the strip."
- Spain — Foreign Minister José Manuel Albares condemned the Israeli attacks on Gaza and said to the broadcaster Onda Cero he "can't find the words to describe the situation in Gaza, We must mourn and reject this new wave of violence and these new bombings, which indiscriminately hit the civilian population".
- Sweden — Foreign Minister Maria Malmer Stenergard called the attacks on Gaza "dangerous", calling for an end to the violence.
- Switzerland — The Federal Department of Foreign Affairs wrote on Twitter that they call for an immediate return to the ceasefire, the release of all hostages, and the unimpeded delivery of humanitarian aid.
- Turkey — The Foreign Ministry called the Israeli attacks a "new phase in its policy of genocide", further stating that it was unacceptable for Israel to cause a "new cycle of violence" in the region adding Israel's "hostile approach" threatened the future of the region. Turkish President Recep Tayyip Erdoğan called Israel a "terrorist state".
- United Arab Emirates — The Foreign ministry condemned in its "strongest terms" the Israeli attacks that "led to the deaths and injuries of hundreds of Palestinians, which constitutes a breach of the ceasefire agreement reached in January," the foreign ministry warns of the "consequences of any military escalation which threatens to cause further loss of innocent life and exacerbate the humanitarian catastrophe in the Gaza Strip".
- United Kingdom — The British government called on Israel and Hamas to implement their ceasefire agreement for Gaza "in full", calling for all parties to "return urgently to dialogue". The spokesperson for Prime Minister Keir Starmer stated that "We want to see this ceasefire agreement re-established as soon as possible," adding that reported civilian casualties from Israeli strikes overnight were "appalling". Foreign Secretary David Lammy said that "Diplomacy, not more bloodshed, is how we get security for Israelis and Palestinians." The Starmer government publicly rejected a statement by Lammy to the House of Commons assessing that Israel had broken international law with the strikes. Starmer's office stated that it was up to the Foreign Office to decide whether Lammy had overstepped the government's attitude toward the attacks, and if he should apologize.
- United States — White House Press Secretary Karoline Leavitt stated that President Trump made it clear that groups like Hamas, the Houthis, and Iran will face consequences for their actions against both Israel and the U.S. She also stated that Trump "fully supports Israel and the IDF and the actions that they've taken in recent days" against the Gaza Strip. Acting U.S. Ambassador to the UN, Dorothy Shea, stated that Hamas had rejected all ceasefire proposals and thus bears full responsibility for the renewed violence.
- Yemen — The Houthi-run Supreme Political Council condemned the "Zionist enemy's resumption of aggression against the Gaza Strip", further stating that "The Palestinian people will not be left alone in this battle, and Yemen will continue its support and assistance, and escalate confrontation steps". A rocket was fired by the Houthis toward Ben Gurion Airport; Israel stated that it was intercepted before it reached Israeli territory.

=== Non-government and international organizations ===
- Action for Humanity — The group condemned the attack, claiming that the Israeli government has no interest in "acting within the framework of international law or to secure a just and lasting peace; for their own people or for Palestine".
- Council on American–Islamic Relations — The organization has condemned the Israeli government for "resuming its horrific and genocidal attacks on the men, women and children of Gaza, killing hundreds of civilians in a matter of hours", further stating that Netanyahu would "clearly rather massacre Palestinian children in refugee camps than risk the disintegration of his cabinet by exchanging all those held by both sides and permanently ending the genocidal war, as required by the ceasefire agreement that President Trump helped broker and that he must salvage".
- Hezbollah — Hezbollah condemned the continuation of Israel's "war of termination" and reaffirms its support for Gaza.
- Hostages and Missing Families Forum — The organization made a statement condemning the renewed attacks as the "intentional shattering" of the process of returning the fifty-nine remaining hostages, and accused Netanyahu's government of "choosing to give up the lives of the hostages". The forum demanded a return to ceasefire conditions and urged United States President Donald Trump to negotiate for the release of all hostages.
- Human Rights Watch — The director of the Israel-Palestine branch of the HRW Omar Shakir, says that Israel is openly violating international law in Gaza and urges the international community to hold Israeli officials accountable and end all arms transfers to the country.
- International Committee of the Red Cross — The organization warns that medics are struggling to manage a sharp increase in casualties during the attacks and the blockade of humanitarian aid to Gaza.
- Islamic Relief — The organization has condemned the inaction of Western and Arab Israeli allies, stating that their "superficial expressions of concerns" instead of imposing arms and trade restrictions against Israel meant little in the face of repeated violations of international law, and made them complicit in the ongoing crimes against humanity.
- Médecins Sans Frontières — The organization calls for the resumption of the ceasefire and says that Israel is subjecting Gaza to collective punishment.
- Norwegian Refugee Council — the group's stated that the Israeli attacks threatens to "plunge Gaza into yet another cycle of mass death, destruction, and displacement".
- Save the Children — humanitarian director based in central Gaza's Deir al-Balah, Rachael Cummings, said the collapse of the ceasefire was "nothing short of a death sentence for Gaza's children", she further stated that the denial of aid coinciding with the holy month of Ramadan amounted to a "grave violation against children".
- United Nations — Secretary-General Antonio Guterres said in a statement issued by his spokesperson that he is "shocked" by the Israeli attacks, which has killed "a meaningful number" of civilians, further stating that he "strongly appeals for the ceasefire to be respected, for unimpeded humanitarian assistance to be reestablished and for the remaining hostages to be released unconditionally".
  - UNRWA — The head of the organization Philippe Lazzarini condemned the attack, he wrote "Awful scenes of civilians killed among them children following waves of heavy bombardment from Israeli Forces overnight," he wrote. "Fuelling 'hell on earth' by resuming the war will only bring more despair & suffering."
  - UNOCHA — Spokesperson Olga Cherevko warned that the situation remains "volatile" as the attacks continue.
  - OHCHR — High Commissioner Volker Türk stated that the attack will "add tragedy onto tragedy," he further stated that the Israeli attack would "only heap further misery upon a Palestinian population already suffering catastrophic conditions".
  - WHO — Director-general Tedros Adhanom Ghebreyesus stated on Twitter that the renewed attacks could "put millions of lives at risk again" and calls for the resumption of ceasefire.
- European Union — High Representative for Foreign Affairs and Security Policy Kaja Kallas said in a social media post that "Israel must end its military operations and resume entry of humanitarian aid and electricity to Gaza. Hamas must release all hostages immediately." European Council President Antonio Costa stated on Twitter that he was "shocked and saddened" by the killing of civilians in the Israeli attacks on Gaza, saying that all hostages and detainees must be released, and humanitarian aid must be resumed immediately.

== See also ==
- January 2025 Gaza war ceasefire
- Israeli war crimes
- Israeli war crimes in the Gaza war
- Israeli bombing of the Gaza Strip
- Gaza genocide
