= Netzarim Corridor =

Military passage through the Gaza Strip

Coordinates: 31.4697°N 34.4316°E

- Military occupation
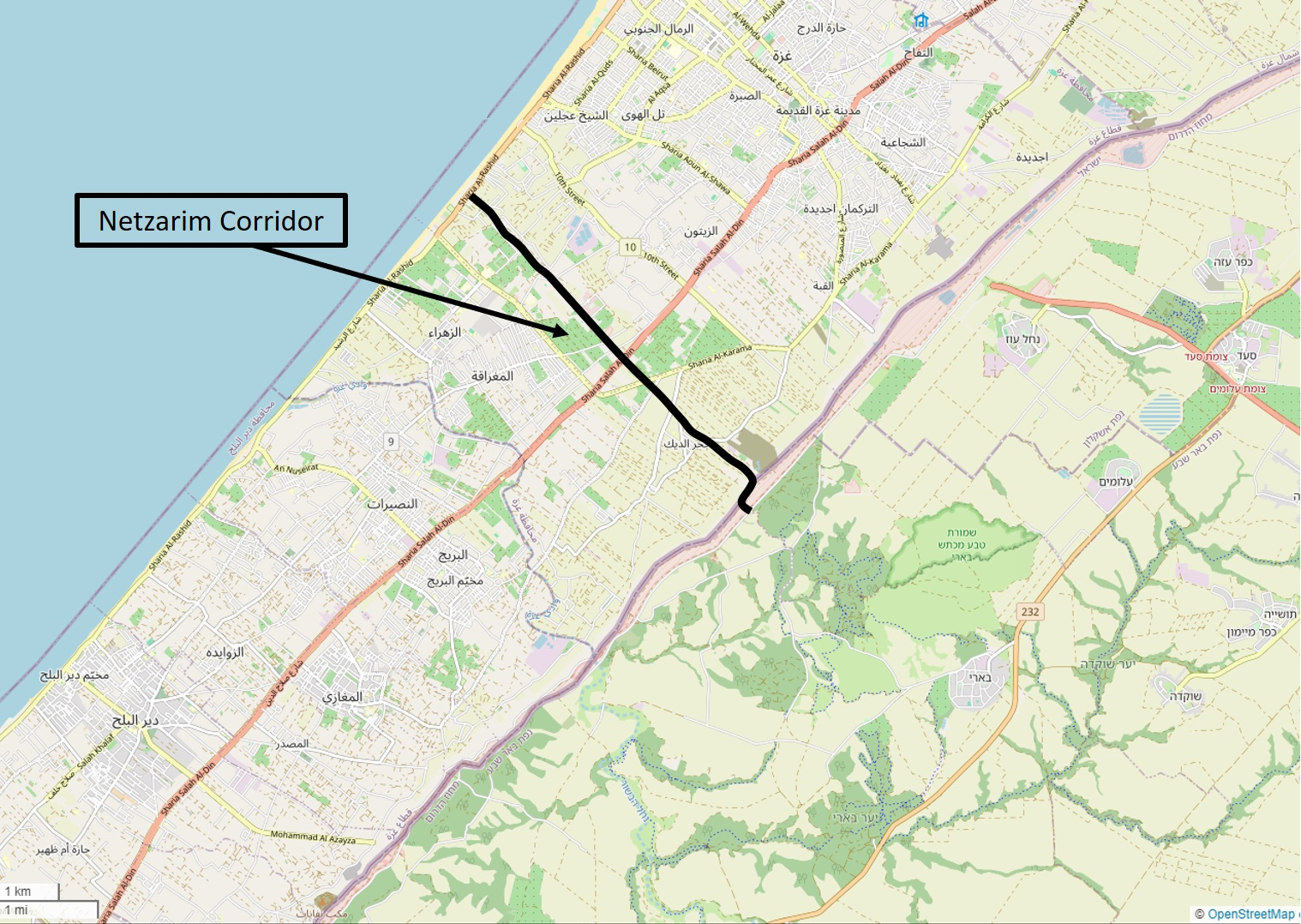
- Approximate location of the Netzarim Corridor as it extends from the Gaza–Israel border to the Mediterranean Sea. The corridor's width is approximately 4 km, centered on Route 749.
- Interactive map of Netzarim Corridor
- Region: Gaza Strip

The Netzarim Corridor is an area in the Gaza Strip that has served as an Israeli zone of military occupation during the Gaza war. The corridor, which splits the Gaza Strip down the middle, is located just south of Gaza City and stretches from the Gaza–Israel border to the Mediterranean Sea.

The Israel Defense Forces (IDF) considers this corridor to be essential for carrying out raids in northern and central Gaza, as well as securely channeling aid into the region. The corridor was run by IDF divisions that rotated in and out of it, particularly the 99th Division and 252nd Division.

Following a ceasefire with Hamas that came into effect on 19 January 2025, Israel withdrew from parts of the Netzarim Corridor on 27 January. Israel completely withdrew its troops from the corridor on 9 February 2025. Large crowds of displaced Gazans were then able to cross through and return to their homes in the northern Gaza Strip. However, the IDF returned to the corridor on 19 March after the ceasefire broke down.

== Background ==
Netzarim was an Israeli settlement in the Gaza Strip which was built in 1972 and dismantled in 2005 during the Israeli disengagement from the territory. The IDF captured the site of the former settlement during the 2008-2009 Gaza War, which ended with a ceasefire and Israeli withdrawal from the Strip.

The IDF named the present corridor after Netzarim, since it includes the site of the former settlement.

== History ==
=== Invasion of the Gaza Strip ===
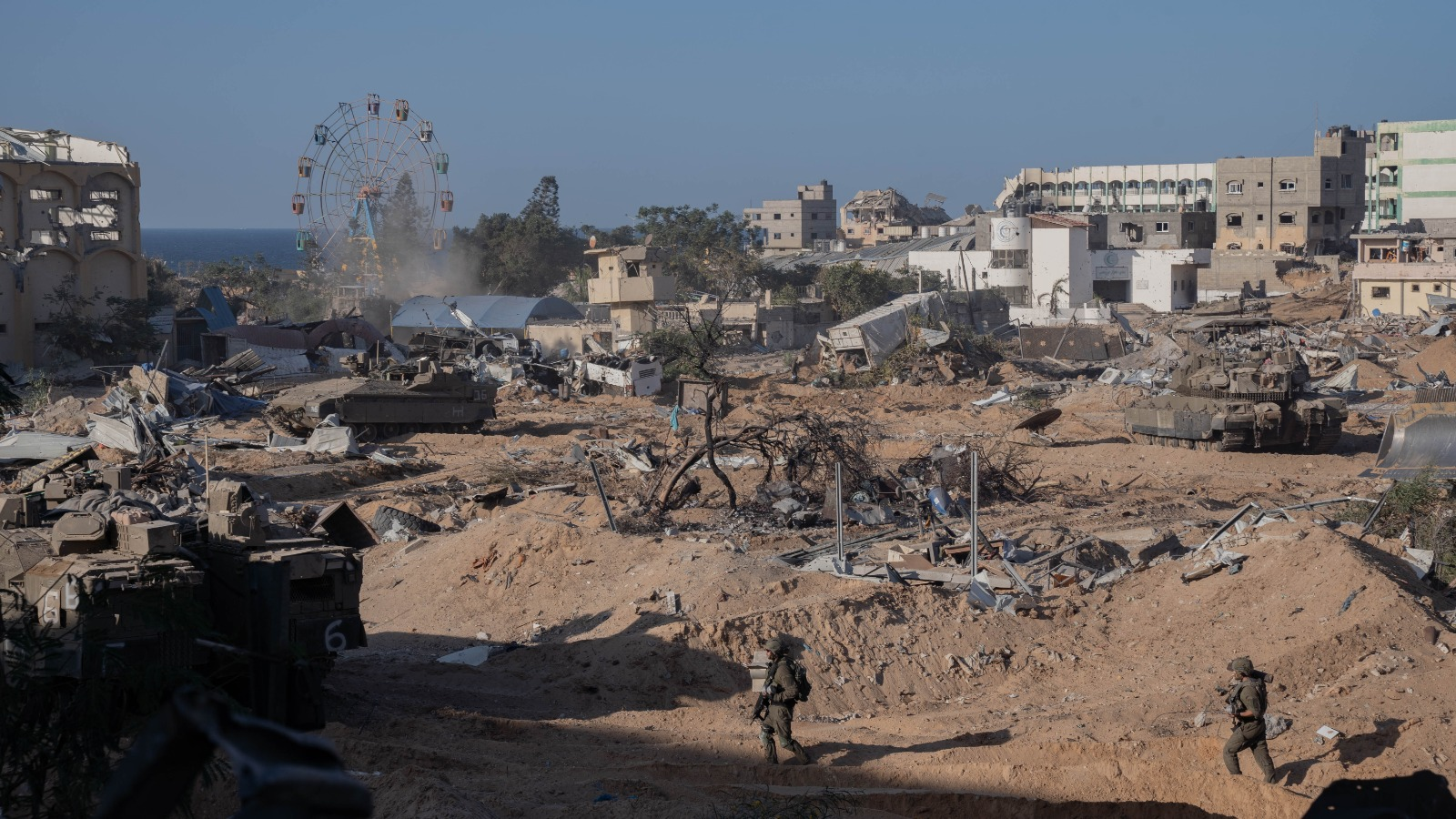
IDF clearing the Netzarim corridor, 7 November 2023

Israel invaded the Gaza Strip on 27 October 2023 as a response to the 2023 Hamas-led attack on Israel three weeks prior. On 30 October 2023, IDF troops were confirmed to have entered the area of the former Netzarim settlement. By 6 November, the IDF "had cut an informal, winding track" across the Gaza Strip which reached to the coast. On 24 November, it was reported that the IDF would "continue administrative and logistical movements on the Netzarim axis and coastal road in the northern Gaza Strip".

Satellite imagery from 6 March 2024 showed that a 4 miles (6.4 km) long partially paved road, numbered Route 749, had been constructed within the corridor. Approximately 1.2 miles (1.9 km) of the road consists of pavement that existed prior to the Gaza war, with Israel clearing a path through the entire width of the strip. The IDF also repaired portions that were destroyed by armored vehicles and reinforced it with multiple lanes for various types of military vehicles. Satellite imagery from 24 May 2024 showed new pavement had been laid over gravel roads since 18 May 2024 up to the intersection with the Salah al-Din Road.

According to the Institute for the Study of War, in July 2024 Israel increased the width of the corridor from 2 kilometres (1.2 mi) to 4 kilometres (2.5 mi).

On 17 August 2024, two Israeli soldiers of the Jerusalem Brigade's 8119th Battalion were killed in the Netzarim Corridor by a Hamas ambush which included a roadside bomb and militants firing on the convoy.

Iran claimed that it successfully hit the Netzarim Corridor as part of its October 2024 Iranian airstrikes on Israel. The claim has not been confirmed by Israel nor any Western analyst.

Between September and November 2024, Israeli soldiers demolished over 600 buildings around the road to create a buffer zone, in addition to increasing the presence of outposts, communication towers, and defensive fortifications.

On 18 December 2024, the Israeli newspaper Haaretz published the testimonies of commanders and officers of the 252nd Division and the 99th Division about the Netzarim Corridor being a "kill zone" with arbitrary lines where every Palestinian is shot for being a suspected terrorist. One officer claimed that a report of 200 killed Hamas militants was wrong since "of those 200 casualties, only ten were confirmed as known Hamas operatives".

=== January 2025 ceasefire ===
As part of a ceasefire agreement with Hamas that came into effect on 19 January 2025, Israel agreed to gradually withdraw from the Netzarim Corridor.

On 25 January, Hamas failed to release a hostage scheduled for transfer to Israel under the ceasefire's prisoner exchange. As a result, Israel suspended its planned opening up of the Netzarim Corridor. However, the release of the hostage was later arranged and Israel opened up the western part of the corridor on the morning of 27 January, with large crowds of displaced Gazans returning to the north. The IDF also began withdrawing from the part that was opened. American and Egyptian security contractors, working under an Egyptian-Qatari committee tasked with implementing the ceasefire, began inspecting vehicles moving through the area. Hamas militants were also later seen stationed at the Netzarim Corridor. On 9 February 2025, Israel fully withdrew its troops from the Netzarim Corridor.

=== Resumption of hostilities ===
On 18 March, the security contractors left the corridor before dawn, when the IDF initiated a "focused ground operation" in central Gaza with the intention of creating a "partial buffer zone" and to re-take the Netzarim Corridor bisecting the Gaza Strip, after launching attacks across Gaza, killing over 400 and ending the ceasefire. On March 19, Israeli forces returned and recaptured the central part of the corridor.

On May 25, 2025, the Gaza Humanitarian Foundation established a food distribution center in Netzarim Corridor, along with three other sites in southern Gaza.

=== October 2025 ceasefire ===
Under the terms of the Gaza war peace plan that went into effect on October 10, 2025, Israeli forces pulled back from the coast of Gaza and the site of Netzarim to a line closer to the Gaza-Israel border.

Near the site of the Netzarim settlement, the Gaza Humanitarian Foundation closed down its food distribution site in favor of aid being distributed by UN-affiliated organizations.

== See also ==
- Netzarim Junction
- Morag Corridor
- Philadelphi Corridor
