= Salah al-Din Road =

Highway in Gaza Strip, Palestine

- طريق صلاح الدين

Route information
- Length: 45 km (28 mi)

Location
- Gaza Strip, Palestine

Salah ad-Deen Highway on Gaza Strip map

Salah al-Din Road (Arabic: طريق صلاح الدين), also known as Salaheddin Road and the Salah ad-Deen Highway, is the main highway of the Gaza Strip, a territory of the State of Palestine. The highway extends over 45 kilometers, spanning the entire length of the territory from the Rafah Crossing in the south to the Erez Crossing in the north. The road is named after the 12th-century Muslim general Salah al-Din.

== History ==
Salah al-Din Road is one of the oldest roads in the world. The armies of Ancient Egypt, Alexander the Great, the first Crusaders and Napoleon all traveled on it in their attempts to conquer the Levant. From Ottoman Empire rule beginning in the early 16th century, the road extended from al-Arish in Sinai in the south to modern-day Turkey in the north. For centuries it was known as the "Way of the Philistines" and linked Egypt to present-day Lebanon, Syria, Turkey and beyond. After gaining control over Palestine following World War I, the British constructed a railroad running adjacently parallel to the Salah ad-Din Road for efficient supply and weapons transport.

According to historian Gerald Butt, "The whole focus of life" in Gaza City was directly related to the road which "gave the city its raison d'être." However, since the establishment of Israel in 1948 and the ongoing Arab–Israeli conflict, its former role as a major link between Egypt and Syria has diminished.

During Israel's occupation of the Gaza Strip between 1967 and 2005, large parts of the Salah al-Din Road were closed to Palestinian traffic and designated as parts of Israel's Highway 4, and there were 12 checkpoints defended by the Israeli Army. Repairs to the road in December 1996 led to the discovery of the Byzantine Church of Jabalia. During the Second Intifada (2000–2005) the road was also closed to Israeli traffic, except for small parts of it. Since Hamas assumed control of the territory after the 2007 Battle of Gaza with Fatah, they controlled those checkpoints. Hamas widened the road with funds coming from their tunnel industry revenues. In 2010 The National wrote of the Salah al-Din Road "Now, toiling farmers, tinkering mechanics and an array of colourful roadside businesses span the length of Salah al Din, from central to southern Gaza. Camels weave aimlessly between its lanes, workers dig for gravel at its edges, and teetering, horn-blaring lorries run up and down the road to ferry smuggled goods and aid assistance to Gaza's 1.5 million people ..."

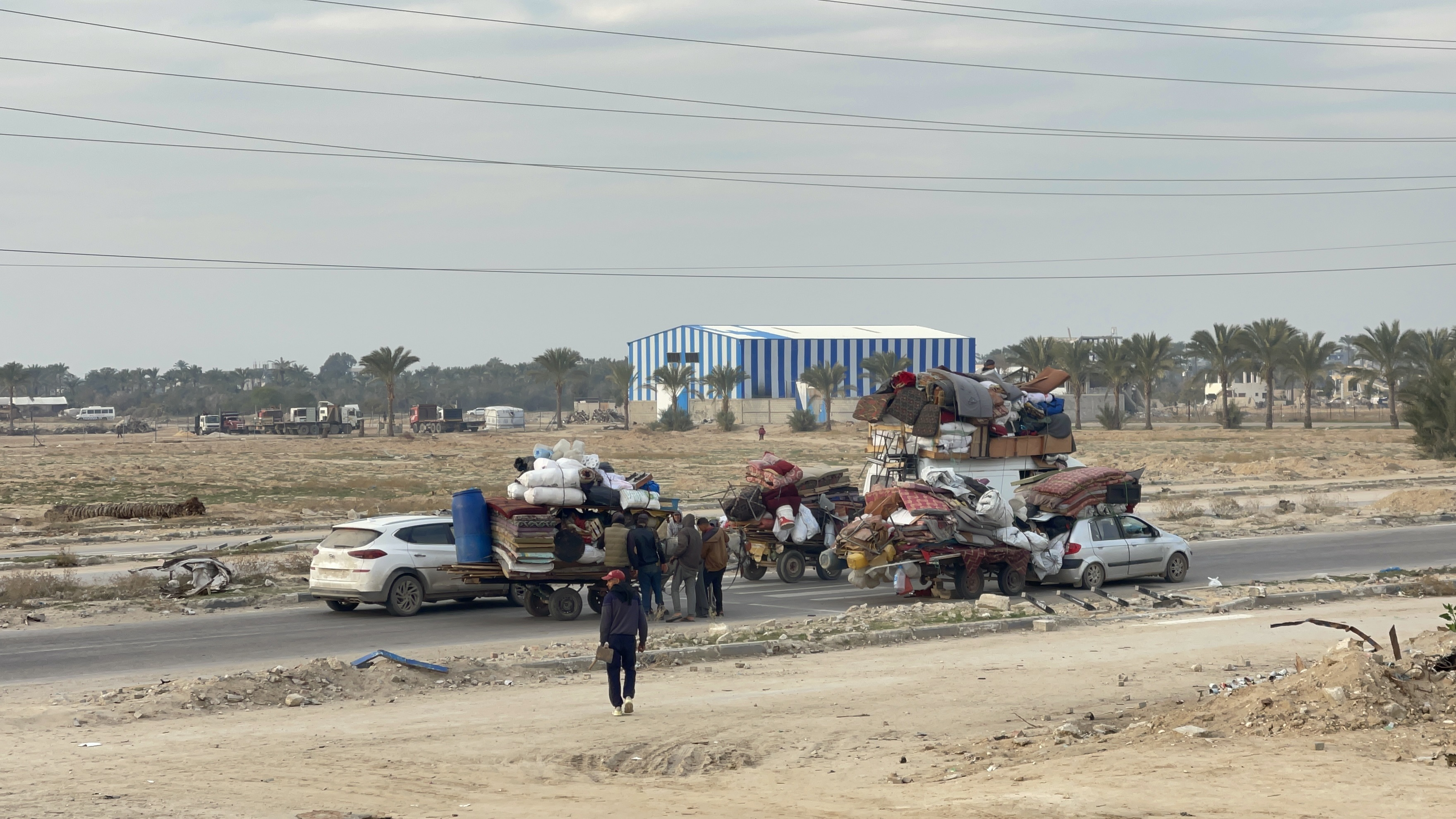
Palestinians displaced by Israeli bombing of the Gaza Strip, Salah ad-Din Road, January 28, 2025

During the Gaza war, Salah al-Din Road was designated by the Israel Defense Forces as a corridor for civilians to evacuate from Gaza City. Despite being designated as a route for safe passage, the road became a "road of death" according to witnesses. A convoy of civilians fleeing the northern side of the Gaza Strip was bombed on Salah al-Din Road on 13 October, 2023. As of 10 May 2024, the IDF captured part of the road during its Rafah offensive.
