= Route 749 (Gaza) =

Military road through the Gaza Strip

- כביש 749
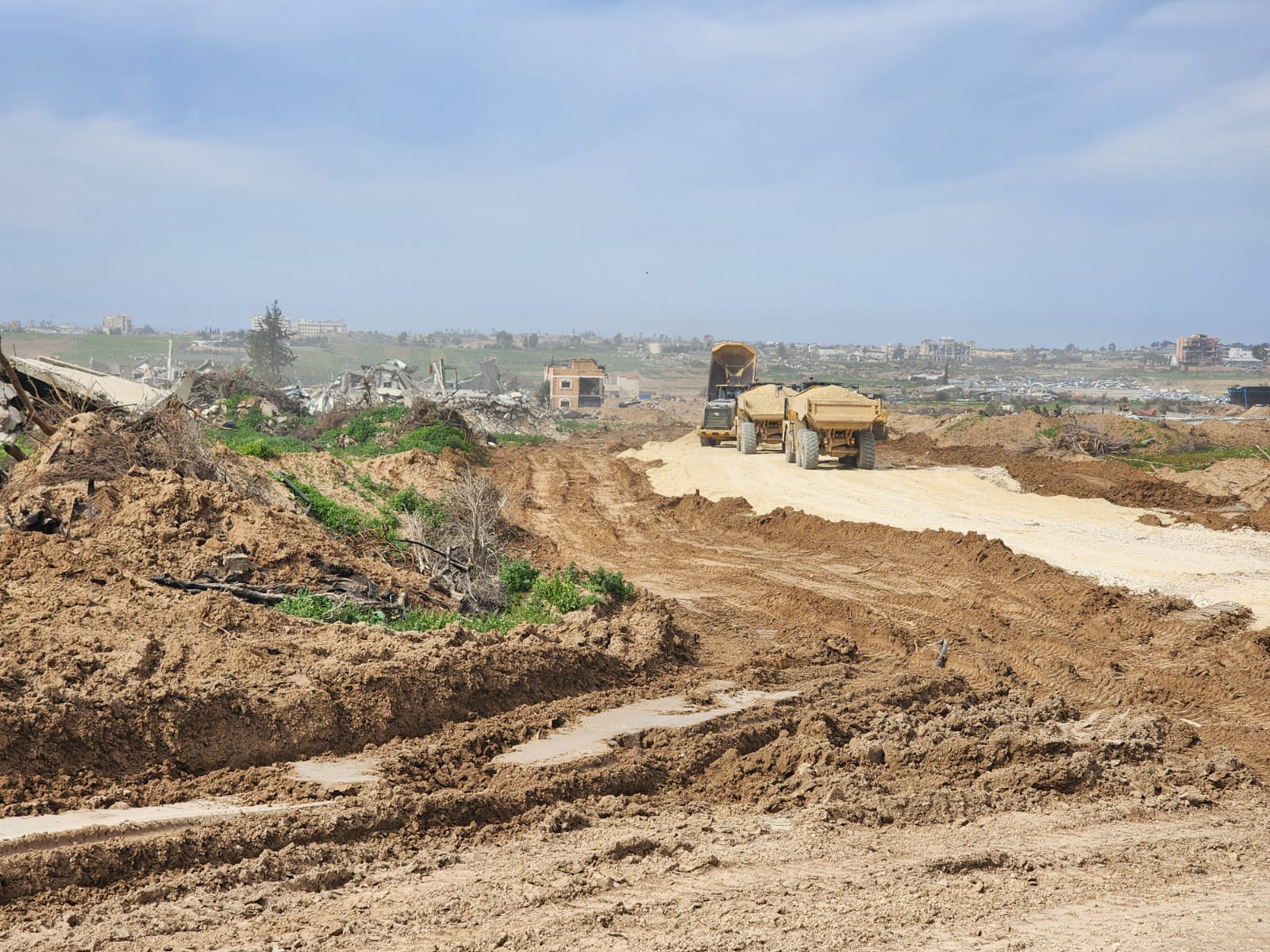
- Construction work on the route

Route information
- Length: 6.8 km (4.2 mi)
- Existed: October 2023–present

Route 749 (Hebrew: כביש 749), also known as the Cross-Gaza Highway (Hebrew: כביש חוצה עזה) or Netzarim Corridor (Hebrew: מסדרון נצרים) is an east–west road in the Gaza Strip, bisecting the strip into northern and southern parts. The road was built by the Israel Defense Forces during the Gaza war in 2023 to facilitate Israeli military operations within the Strip.

== Route and purpose ==
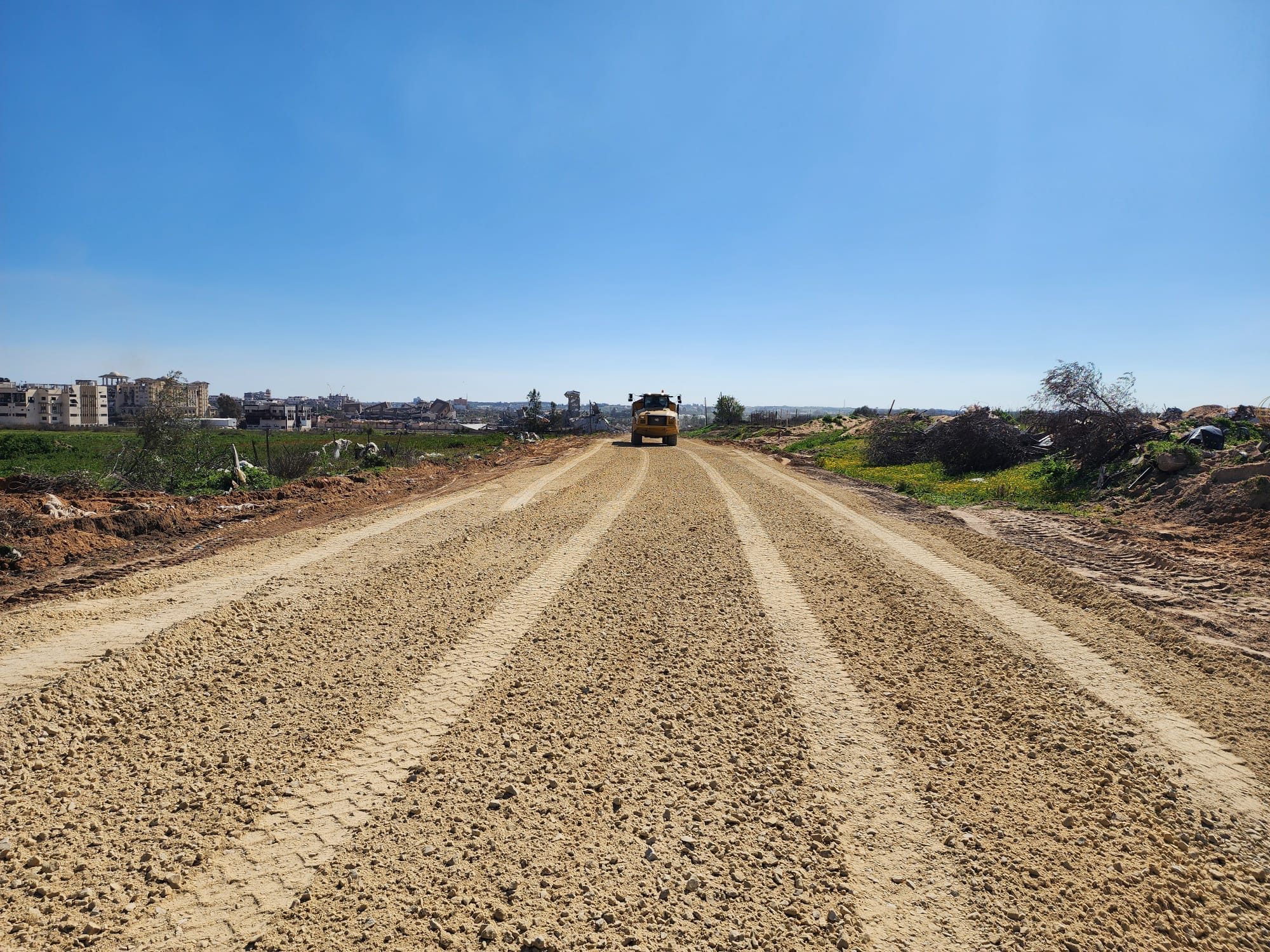
The route in the process of being paved

The road begins near Kibbutz Be'eri in Israel and travels west through the entire Gaza Strip before reaching the Mediterranean Sea. The road is parallel to the northern border of the strip, bisecting the area into north and south. According to the commander of the IDF's 601st Battalion, the purpose of the route is the to "protect the area, advance towards enemy territory, prevent the passage from the south to the north and to control it very precisely".

In February 2024, the IDF's Combat Engineering Corps and 601st Battalion operated dozens of engineering vehicles and dirt trucks to begin the route's paving process. To help with this process, stone factories were opened in the area, where crushed stones acted as a base for paving the road. By March 6, satellite images showed that the IDF had completed the paving of the route.

According to the Israeli Army Radio, the road is designed to be built for travel at speeds of up to 70 km/h (43 mph), and is not just built for armoured personnel carriers, but also for regular vehicles.

On 25 April 2024, the paving of the 6.8-kilometre (4.2 mi) road was completed, so that a trip along the entire route takes about 8 minutes.
