= Mohammed Omer (journalist) =

Palestinian-Dutch author (born 1984)

Mohammed Omer Almoghayer
- محمد عمر المغير
- Born: 1984 (age 41–42); Rafah Camp
- Occupation: Author

Mohammed Omer Almoghayer (Arabic: محمد عمر المغير), (born 1984) is a Palestinian author. He has reported for numerous media outlets, including The New York Times, the Washington Report on Middle East Affairs, Al Jazeera, New Statesman, Pacifica Radio, Electronic Intifada, The Nation, Inter Press Service, Free Speech Radio News, Vermont Guardian, ArtVoice Weekly, the Norwegian Morgenbladet, and Dagsavisen, the Swedish dailies Dagen Nyheter and Aftonbladet the Swedish magazine Arbetaren, the Basque daily Berria, the German daily Junge Welt and the Finish magazine Ny Tid. He also founded Rafah Today and is the author of several books, including Shell-Shocked. His work has been translated into 23 languages, including Hindi, Chinese, Portuguese, Spanish, French and Japanese. He completed his doctoral studies, culminating in a PhD degree, at both Columbia University and Erasmus University Rotterdam. During his time, he also held a prestigious scholarship. In 2015, he assumed the role of a Research Scholar at Harvard University.

== Awards ==
In 2008, Omer was awarded the 2007 Martha Gellhorn Prize for Journalism. In the award citation, he was honored as "the voice of the voiceless" and his reports were described as an "humane record of the injustice imposed on a community forgotten by much of the world". Noam Chomsky said he had been following Omer's work for several years and was pleased to learn of his award, "an honor that he richly deserves". He went on, he "...has continued his work with courage and integrity. It is no exaggeration to say that he can serve as a model of honorable journalism." He was awarded the Ossietzky Prize by the Norwegian branch of P.E.N. International in 2009, for "outstanding achievements within the field of free expression". He was also given an honorable mention in Pulse Media's 20 Top Global Media Figures of 2009.

- "Best Youth Voice" (2006).
- Martha Gellhorn Prize for Journalism (2008)
- Ossietzky Prize (2009
- Press Freedom Prize (2009)
- Ranked 398 by Arabian Business Power 500 (2013)

== Background ==
Omer was born and raised in the Rafah refugee camp at the southern end of the Gaza Strip near the Egyptian border. He began working to support his family at the age of six when his father was in an Israeli prison. In time, he took a job at a backpack factory and since then has been a translator, journalist and program co-ordinator.

Omer graduated with dual bachelor degrees, English and literature, from the Islamic University of Gaza in June 2006.

== Incidents ==
Israeli restrictions have sometimes stopped him travelling to the West Bank.

In 2008, while traveling back to the Gaza Strip via Allenby Bridge to the West Bank, Omer reported that he was stripped to his underwear, humiliated and beaten by Israeli soldiers while traveling into the West Bank from Jordan. According to a United Nations report, Omer is convinced that the brutal assault occurred when the security services were frustrated at their inability to confiscate the money he had been awarded.

He was subsequently hospitalized on his return to Gaza, where it was discovered that he had sustained several broken ribs and various bodily contusions as a result of the ordeal. Omer has recovered since and has been able to maintain his position as a journalist. The government of The Netherlands, which had sent a diplomatic mission to welcome Omer and accompany him to Gaza, lodged an official protest with Israel about his mistreatment.
