= Canada Camp =

Palestinian refugee camp

Coordinates: 31°17′25.91″N 34°14′16.45″E

Canada Camp was a Palestinian refugee camp in the northern Sinai near Rafah, formed in 1972 and evacuated in 2000. The Camp was named after the Canadian contingent of the United Nations Emergency Force (UNEF I), which formerly had a camp at the location. Most refugees were relocated to Tel al-Sultan in the southern Gaza Strip.

== Establishment ==
In the 1967 Six-Day War, Israel conquered the Sinai and the adjacent Gaza Strip. In 1970–1971, Israel demolished homes in Rafah for road widening under the pretense of security measures. Sixteen thousand Palestinian refugees, a quarter of them in Rafah, were forced to relocate when their shelters were destroyed by the Israeli authorities. At least two thousand of the displaced were moved to al-Arish, in the occupied Sinai, and several hundred to the West Bank.

In 1972, the Canada Camp Housing Project was established in Egyptian Rafah, just across the international boundary with Sinai, initiated by the Israeli Government. UNRWA provided schooling and some medical care with staff who had also been stranded across the border. The refugees had no legal right to work in Egypt and were provided with food rations and minimal amounts of cash aid. This camp became known as "Canada Camp", named after the Canadian contingent of the UNEF, which formerly had a camp at the location. A similar housing project was developed in 1973 in the Palestinian half of Rafah, called "Brazil Camp" after the Brazilian UNEF contingent. UNEF I was the first United Nations Emergency Force, operating from November 1956 to June 1967 to serve as a buffer between the Egyptian and Israeli forces and supervise the ceasefire. It was withdrawn in May–June 1967, at Egypt's request.

== Israel-Egypt peace treaty ==
The refugees were told that under the 1978 Camp David Accords, Israel and Egypt had agreed to repatriate them to the Gaza Strip within six months. Following the peace treaty between Egypt and Israel in 1979, which resulted from the Camp David Accords, Israel withdrew from the Sinai in 1982. The Egypt–Gaza border was redrawn, but only eight families returned to the Gaza Strip without any compensation. In 1985, there were still 488 families in Canada Camp. However, funding problems, bureaucratic delays, lack of political will, and difficult security conditions prolonged the process.

== Relocation plan ==
It was not until 1989 that a mechanism for the return of these refugees to the Gaza Strip was established and, with pressure and financial support from the government of Canada and the Kuwaiti fund for Arab Economic Development, together with effort from the other players (namely UNRWA, Israel, and the Palestinian Authority), refugees started moving across the border, mainly to the Tall as-Sultan district of Rafah. In September 1989, Egypt and Israel signed an "Agreed Plan for the Relocation of Canada District Inhabitants to the Region of the Gaza Strip". It stated "that the relocation shall be carried out solely on the basis of the free will of the inhabitants of the Canada District".

As a result, only 20 households returned with $8,000, but without land. After the PLO raised the compensation to $12,000 per household in 1991, 105 families returned to the Gaza Strip, and in 1994 another 70. They each received a plot of land in Tel el Sultan. The money was not enough to obtain a house, so everybody had to borrow. Israeli settlers in the Gaza Strip objected to the return of refugees and delivered in 1989 a rumour to The Jerusalem Post, saying that since 1982, “training” had been given to people in Canada Camp and the relocation would allow the entry of “750 terrorists” into the Gaza Strip.

After the 1993–1995 Oslo Accords, the Palestinian Authority became involved in the relocation process. It was not until 27 December 2000 that the last families were able to return. Canada also provided funds for the construction of a community centre in Tall as-Sultan for the benefit of the returning families.

== Daily life ==
Life for refugees in Canada Camp was particularly hard, as they were cut off from work in both the Gaza Strip and Israel, and unable to work in Egypt; in fact, they had to pay every six months to have their Egyptian visas renewed. Family and friends, unable to see each other due to the practical impossibility of gaining the necessary permits, could only communicate at the “shouting fence” across the border strip. Higher education and proper health care were only available by paying fees much higher than most people could afford. For treatment of serious medical problems, Canada Camp residents would have to pay locally or travel to the Palestine Red Crescent Hospital in Cairo.

Israel and Egypt disputed over the location where refugees could cross the border. Israel wanted them to use the Israel–controlled Rafah Terminal, Egypt insisted that the Salah al Din Gate in downtown Rafah (also known as the “pishpash” gate) be used, as it was the only direct crossing between Egypt and the Gaza Strip without going through Israeli-controlled areas.

== See also ==
- Department of Foreign Affairs, Trade and Development
- Rafah Camp
