= Irina Scherbakowa =

Russian historian

Irina Sherbakova
- Ирина Щербакова
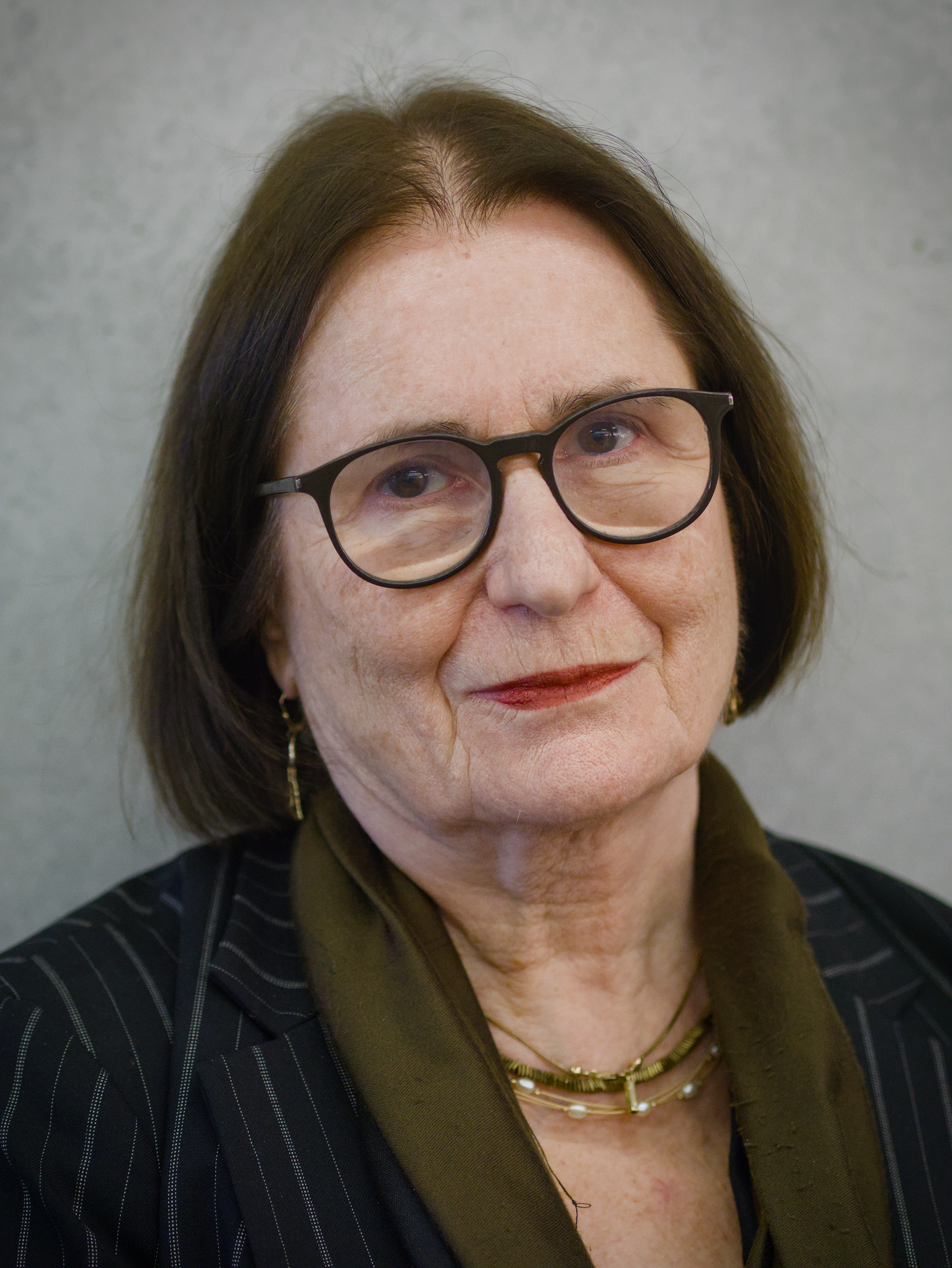
- in 2025
- Born: 1949 (age 76–77); Moscow
- Occupations: Historian, journalist
- Known for: investigating modern Russian history

Irina Lazarevna Scherbakowa (Sherbakova) (Russian: Ирина Лазаревна Щербакова, born 1949) is a Russian historian of the modern age, an author and a founding member of Memorial. She was awarded the Carl von Ossietsky Prize for Contemporary History and Politics in 2014, and the Goethe Medal in 2017. She has been studying Russia's modern history since the 1970s. Memorial was designated a "foreign agent" by Russia in 2016. In 2022 Memorial was co-awarded the Nobel Peace Prize.

== Life ==
Sherbakova was born in Moscow in 1949. Her parents were Russian-Jewish communists. After completing her doctorate in German studies in 1972 Sherbakova worked as a freelance journalist and became a translator of German fiction.

In the late 1970s Sherbakova began to interview Gulag survivors and witnesses to Stalinism afraid to be recorded on tape.

In 1988 she became one of the founding members of the organisation called Memorial and during Perestroika was among those who requested that the authorities resolve the cases of the crimes committed in Russia under Stalinism.

In 2014 Sherbakova was chosen as recipient of the German Ossietzky Award, which includes a prize of 10,000 euros. The judges chose her because of her campaign to study Russia's recent troubled history and for encouraging German–Russian relations.

In 2017, the year after Memorial had been labeled a "foreign agent" by the Russian Ministry of Justice, Sherbakova was awarded the Goethe Medal.

Irina Sherbakova's work has been translated and republished by The Guardian. In 2019 she accused the Russian establishment of trying to rehabilitate Joseph Stalin as a national hero while forgetting his human rights abuses, which claimed millions of lives.

In 2022 Memorial, Russia's first NGO, and most respected rights group, was co-awarded the Nobel Peace Prize less than a year after it had been ordered to shut down during a wave of repression against critical voices.

In 2025 Sherbakova told Austrian broadcaster ORF that US President Donald Trump's one-sided Ukraine politics were a gift to Vladimir Putin's government: "Trump wants to sell Ukraine to Putin," she said.

== Links ==
Norbert Frei and Susanne Buckley-Zistel interviewing Irina Scherbakowa in 2016 (in German).
