= Elisabeth Eide =

Norwegian journalist, novelist, and non-fiction writer

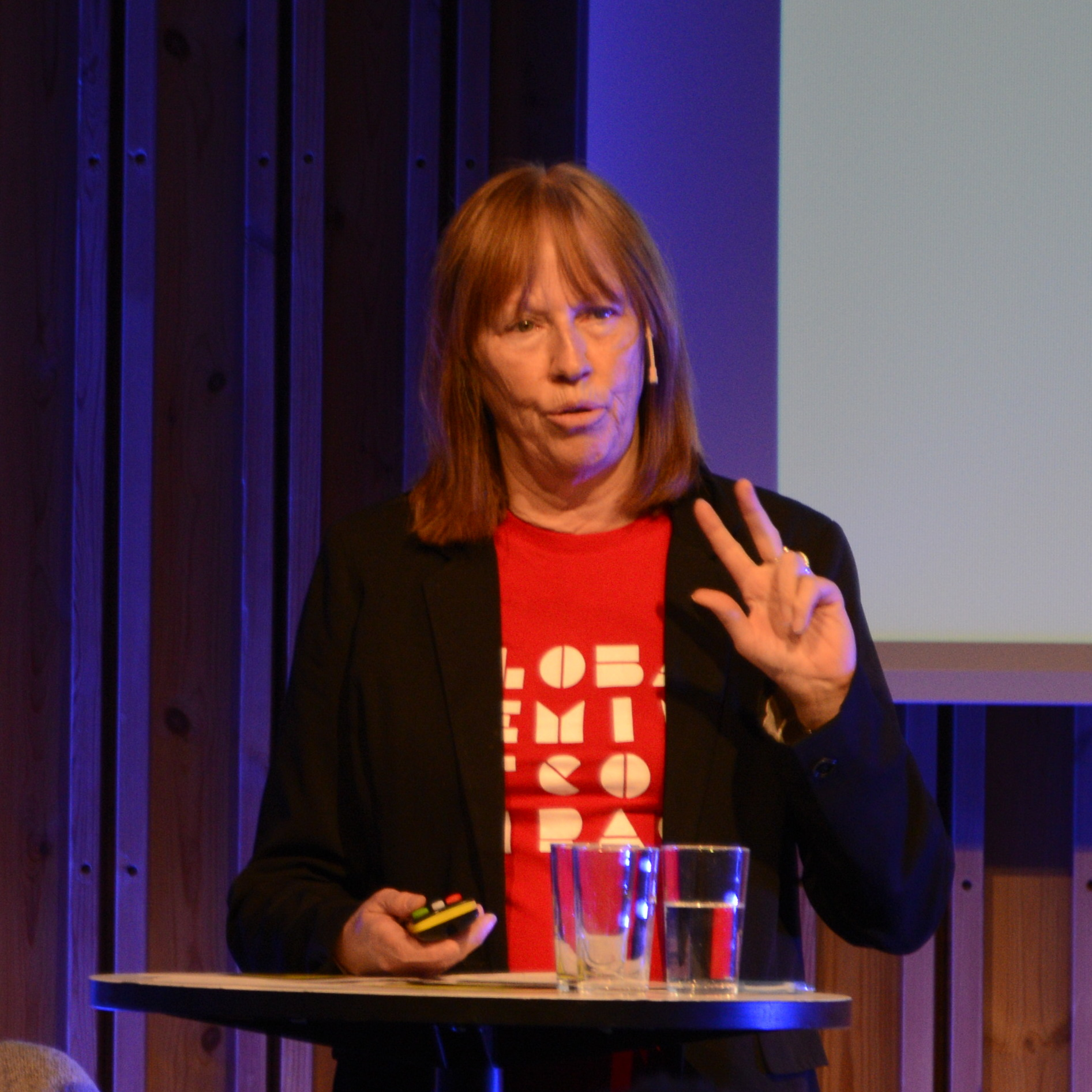
- Born: 22 July 1950 (age 76); Bergen, Norway
- Occupations: journalist, teacher, novelist
- Awards: Ossietzky Award ( 2002)

Elisabeth Eide (born 22 July 1950) is a Norwegian journalist, teacher, novelist and non-fiction writer. She was born in Bergen.

Eide made her novel debut in 1994 with Til Kabul faller . Further novels (crime fiction) are Utviklingens hjul from 1997, Der mørket leker med ilden from 1998, and Skyteskiver from 2000.

She received the Ossietzky Award in 2002.

Eide was an active participant in the Maoist movement in Norway, and was part of a delegation with AKP (m-l) that visited Pol Pot in 1978. She later left the Maoist movement.
