= Sidsel Wold =

Norwegian journalist and nonfiction writer (born 1959)

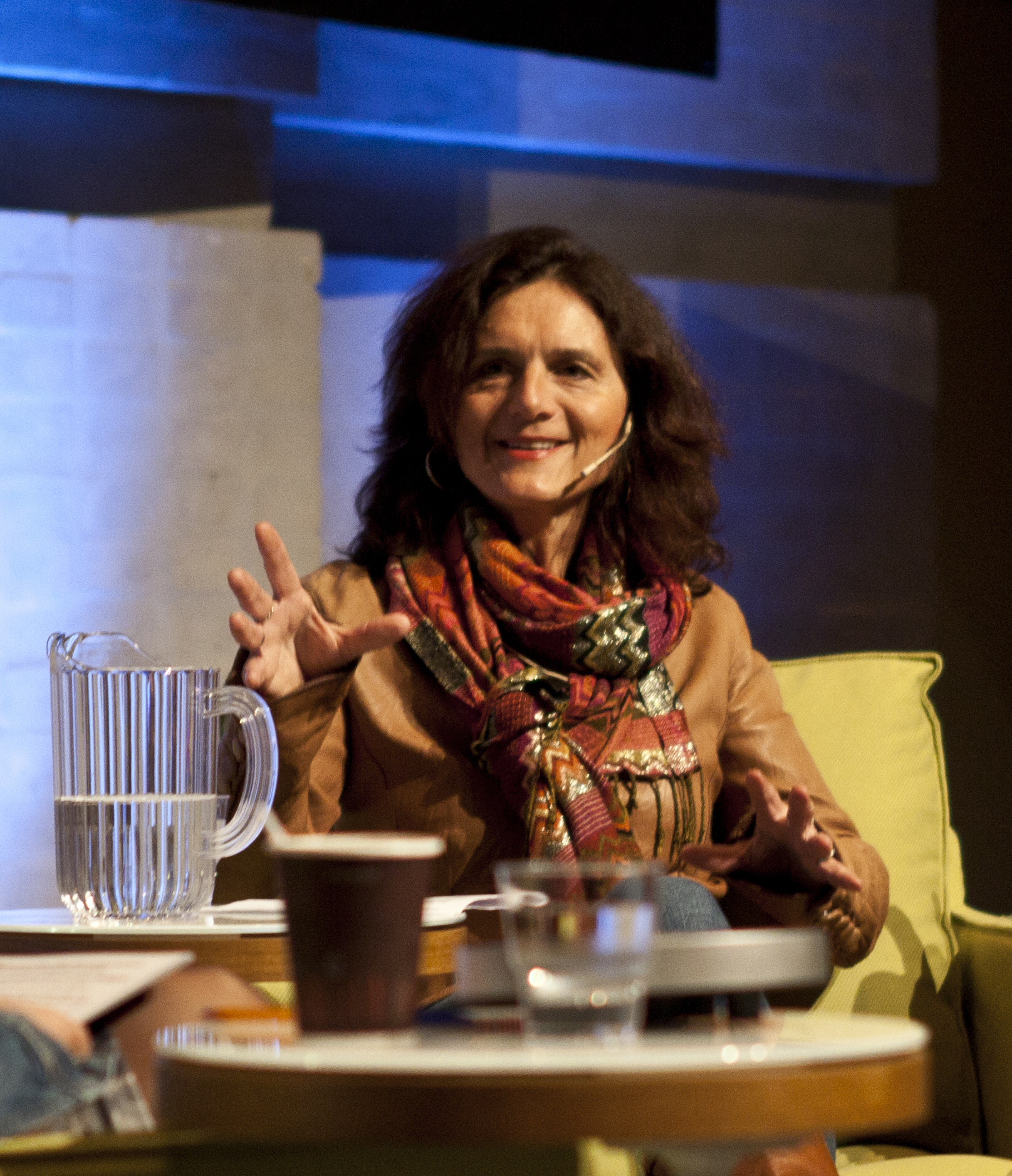
- Born: 23 February 1959 (age 67); Oslo, Norway
- Education: University of Oslo
- Occupations: Journalist and non-fiction writer
- Spouse: Ragnar Kvam Jr.
- Awards: Ossietzky Award (2014); Gullruten honorary award (2023)

Sidsel Wold (born 23 February 1959) is a Norwegian journalist and non-fiction writer. She is known as Middle East correspondent for NRK, and is a recipient of the Ossietzky Award and the Gullruten honorary award.

== Personal life and education ==
Wold was born in Oslo on 23 February 1959, and grew up in Oslo and Bærum. In 1978 she worked at a kibbutz in Israel and learned speaking Hebrew. She has studied Russian language, history and political science at the University of Oslo. She graduated from Norsk journalisthøgskole in 1990.

Wold is married to journalist, non-fiction writer and globetrotter Ragnar Kvam Jr.

== Career ==
Wold worked as journalist for the newspaper Morgenbladet from 1987 to 1988, before her journalist studies. After graduating as journalist in 1990, she started working as program host and reporter for NRK, both radio and television, where she hosted radio shows such as Her og nå and Timen er din. From 2007 to 2011 she was NRK's correspondent for the Middle East region, based in Jerusalem. From 2016 she was again Middle East correspondent for NRK, based in Istanbul.

In 2011 Wold was awarded Perspektivprisen by the Norwegian Refugee Council for her communication of international news, in particular her reports on complex matters from the Middle East. In 2014 she received the Ossietzky Award from the Norwegian chapter of P.E.N., again for her middle East reportings.

Her books include Warra! Warra!: Da de hvite kom til Australia from 1999, which earned her a debut prize from the Norwegian Writers for Children; further Checkpoint: En beretning fra Midtøsten (2006), and Landet som lovet alt: Min israelske reise from 2015.

She received the Gullruten honorary award in 2023.
