= Sidsel Mørck =

Norwegian poet, novelist and columnist (1937–2024)

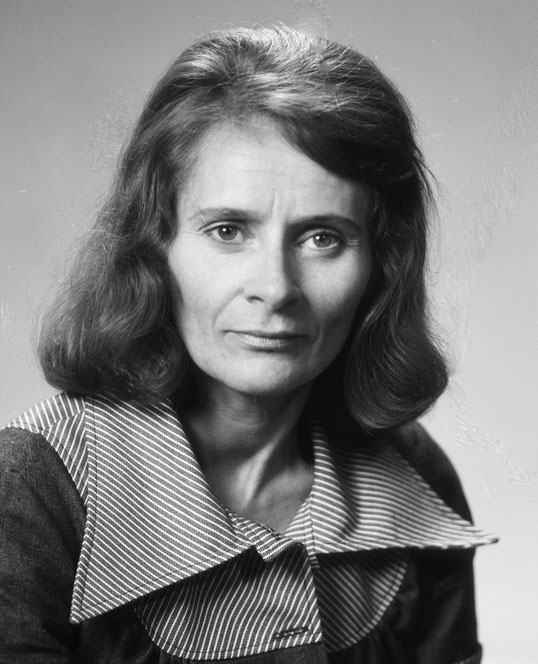
- Mørck in 1976
- Born: Sidsel Mørck; 28 November 1937; Oslo, Norway
- Died: 5 March 2024 (aged 86)
- Occupations: Poet, novelist
- Writing career
- Notable awards: Fritt Ord honorary award (1990); Ossietzky Award (2013)

Sidsel Mørck (28 November 1937 – 5 March 2024) was a Norwegian poet, novelist and columnist. Her awards included the Fritt Ord honorary award and the Ossietzky Award.

== Background ==
Born in Oslo on 28 November 1937, Mørck grew up in Sandefjord, Norway. For ten years, from 1968 to 1978, she lived in the industrial area of Norsk Hydro in Porsgrunn, which sparked her commitment to environmental protection.

Her stepgrandfather, Dimitri Dimitrivich Koloboff, who she called dad, came to Norway from Russia in 1920. His journey is the subject of Mørck's 2010 book Pappa – a Russian refugee.

Mørck died on 5 March 2024, at the age of 86.

== Career ==
Mørck made her literary debut in 1967 with the poetry collection Et ødselt sekund. Further poetry collections are Dager kan vokse from 1969, Apropos (1970), Først var det små rom (1971), I forhold til (1973), En mykere morgen (1977), Byliv (1980), and Hver eneste natt from 1990.

Her collections of songs and poetry for children include Erta, berta sukkererta from 1978, Sur og blid-vers (1987), På tvers-vers (1993) and Hit og dit-vers (2002). In total, she has published over 30 novels, short stories and collections of poems for adults and children. As an activist, she has written over 120 articles on social issues, particularly environmental protection and industrial pollution, and given a number of lectures.

In 2013, Mørck received the Ossietzky Award, in recognition of her strong social commitment, especially in the field of women's affairs, gender roles and environmental protection. As well as including these issues in her writing, Mørck was an active social debater and columnist.

Mørck was on the board of The Sophie Prize, an international environment and development prize awarded annually from 1998 to 2013.

== Awards ==
- 1976: Mads Wiel Nygaards Endowment
- 1988: Oppretter Venstres miljøpris
- 1989: Kardemommestipendiet
- 1990: Fritt Ord Honorary Award
- 1991: Rachel Carson Prize (environmentalist award)
- 1993: Government scholar
- 2009: Vestfold Literature Prize (Vestfolds Litteraturpris)
- 2012: Ordknappen 2012 for the book Brother
- 2013: Ossietzky Award
