= Claus Wiese =

Norwegian actor

- Born: March 1, 1924; Lillestrøm, Norway
- Died: September 7, 1987 (aged 63); Maine, USA
- Occupations: Actor; Radio and TV broadcaster
- Years active: 1945-1986

Claus Wiese (March 1, 1924 – September 7, 1987) was a Norwegian actor and American-based radio and TV broadcaster.

Wiese was born in Lillestrøm. He graduated from the Oslo Cathedral School in 1944 and worked as an actor with the Oslo New Theater from 1945 to 1951. He made his movie acting debut in the 1946 feature Englandsfarere and appeared in six additional films.

Wiese married an American, Joan Ann Trapp, on August 12, 1950. Soon after, the couple moved to the U.S., where Wiese worked as a film editor at the TV station WNAC in Boston, Massachusetts from 1952 to 1954. He was head of programming at WMTW in Poland Spring, Maine from 1954 to 1975, and business director at the same station from 1975 to 1982. In 1982, Wiese became the station manager at WMTV in Auburn, Maine.

In 1961, Wiese and his wife moved to Bethel, Maine, where they owned and operated the Norseman Inn for 25 years.

He was the brother of the author and former administrative director at J.W. Cappelens Forlag, Jan Wiese, and uncle of the television talk show host Claus Wiese.

== Filmography ==
- 1946: Englandsfarere
- 1947: Sankt Hans fest
- 1948: Operation Swallow: The Battle for Heavy Water
- 1949: Love Wins Out (Swedish)
- 1949: Death is a Caress
- 1951: Alt dette - og Island også
- 1951: Dei svarte hestane
