= Ragnar Kvam =

Norwegian writer and translator (1917–2006)

- Born: 18 November 1917; Tønsberg, Norway
- Died: 15 February 2006 (aged 88)
- Occupations: Journalist, novelist, translator and literary critic
- Children: Ragnar Kvam, Jr.

Ragnar Kvam (18 November 1917 – 15 February 2006) was a Norwegian journalist, novelist, translator and literary critic. He was born in Tønsberg and grew up in Drammen. After the Second World War he was journalist in the newspaper Fremtiden, and the Norwegian News Agency. He made his literary debut in 1950 with the novel Alle vil hjem. Among his other novels are De herjede menn from 1953, Den store stillheten from 1964, and Krystallnatten from 1970. He translated many books into Norwegian language, including works by George Orwell, Virginia Woolf, Graham Greene, Oscar Wilde, C. P. Snow and Erich Maria Remarque.

He is the father of Ragnar Kvam, Jr.
