= Jan Wiese =

Jan Wiese (4 March 1928 – 5 July 2014) was a Norwegian publisher and novelist.

Wiese was hired as chief financial officer in Cappelens Forlag in 1964, became assisting director in 1965 and chief executive officer (joint with Sigmund Strømme) from 1973 to 1988. He chaired the Norwegian Publishers' Association from 1975 to 1978. However, he became best known when he in 1990, as a retiree, published the novel Kvinnen som kledde seg naken for sin elskede. The novel became a commercial success and was translated to several languages.

He was married and resided in Bærum, later in Skjetten. He was the brother of the actor and radio broadcaster Claus Wiese, and the father of Andreas Wiese and Claus Wiese.
