= Tel al-Sultan refugee camp =

Palestinian settlement

Tel al-Sultan
- Refugee Camp

Arabic transcription(s)
  - Arabic: معسكر تل السلطان
  - Latin: Tall as Sultan Camp; Tel es-Sultan (official); Tel Al-Sultan Camp (unofficial)
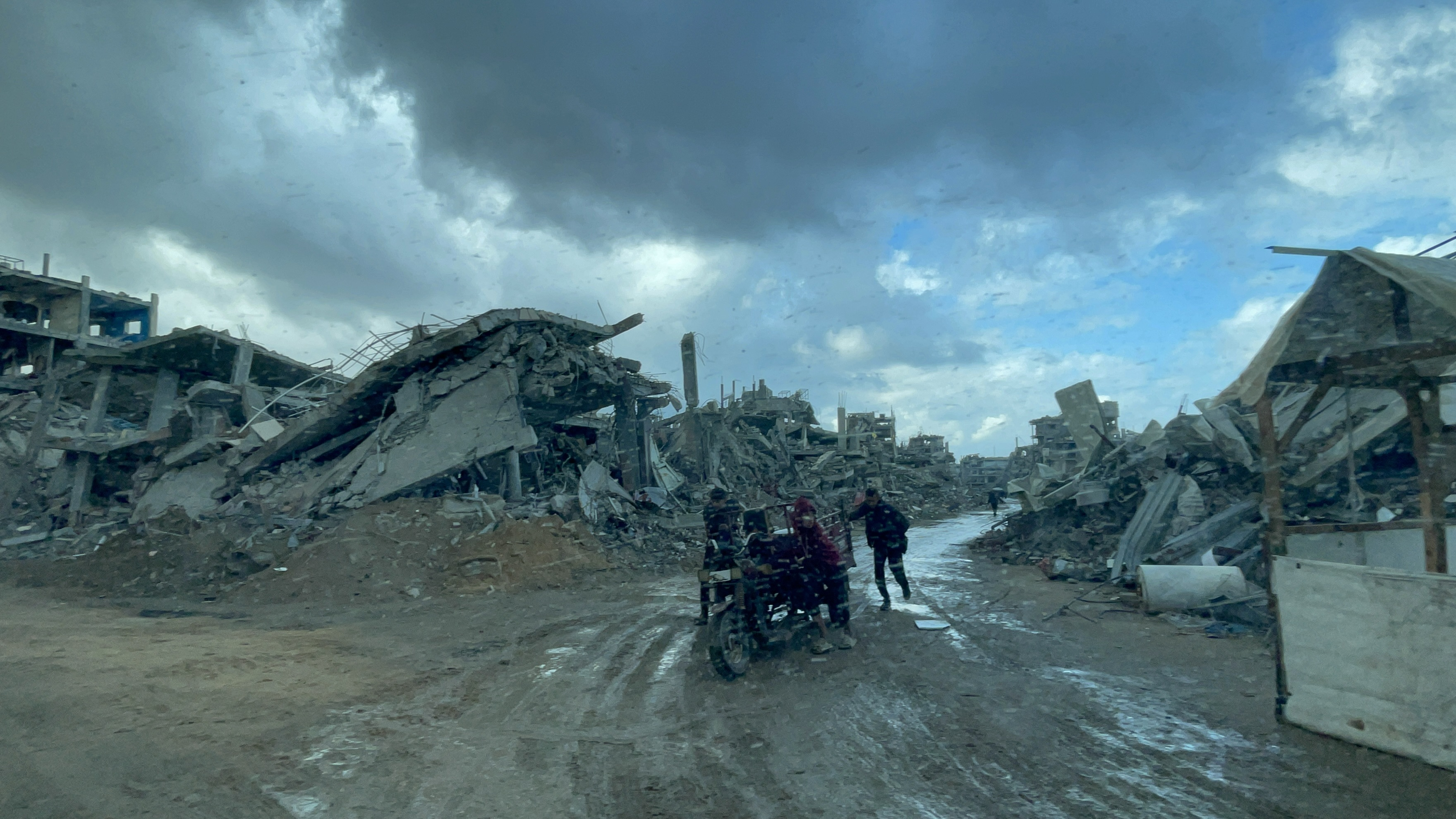
- Middle Street through the camp in February 2025

- Location of Tel al-Sultan within Palestine
- Coordinates: 31°18′32.32″N 34°14′35.17″E
- State: State of Palestine
- Governorate: Rafah

Government
  - Type: Refugee Camp
  - Control: Israel

Population (2006)
  - Total: 24,418

Tel al-Sultan or Tall as-Sultan (Arabic: تل السلطان) is one of eight Palestinian refugee camps in the Gaza Strip. It is located in the Rafah Governorate just north of Rafah city and Rafah Camp. It was established mainly to absorb refugees repatriated from Canada Camp.

UNRWA does not make a distinction between Rafah Camp and Tall as-Sultan. The Palestinian Central Bureau of Statistics 2006 mid-year estimate for Tall as-Sultan is 24,418.

The camp was established in 1989, for Palestinians living in Kanda camp in Egyptian Rafa.

On 6 May, Israeli forces launched a military offensive in and around the city of Rafah. Before and during the initial phase of the operation, Israeli forces conducted at least 50 airstrikes targeting the area.

On 26 May 2024, an Israeli airstrike in the camp killed at least 50 people, most of whom were women and children. According to Israeli authorities, the strike targeted a Hamas installation. The attack triggered a fire in the Tel al-Sultan refugee camp, where dozens of refugees were sheltered.

== Ambush ==
On 15 June 2024, eight Israeli soldiers were killed in an ambush. Members of the armed wing of Hamas, the Izz ad-Din al-Qassam Brigades, ambushed an Israeli convoy near the camp. Their Namer armored personnel carrier and an armored D9 bulldozer were destroyed. On 16 October 2024, Hamas leader Yahya Sinwar was killed in the camp by Israeli forces. On 27 May 2025, at least three Palestinians were killed by Israeli forces while trying to get aid from the Gaza Humanitarian Foundation.

At around 05:15 local time, during an overnight offensive in Tal al-Sultan, a Namer armored personnel carrier, which had been involved in the operation, was returning with the rest of the force to captured buildings to allow troops to rest. Hamas first targeted a Caterpillar D9 armored bulldozer with an Al-Yassin 105 anti-armor missile, setting it on fire and causing injuries and fatalities among its crew. Following this, Hamas fired another Al-Yassin 105 missile at the Namer, which was the fifth or sixth vehicle in the convoy. Initially, it was believed that the Namer may have hit a land mine or that an explosive device had been placed on it. The Namer was ultimately destroyed by the missile, and its crew was killed. It burned for about two hours after the ambush, before being towed to a safe location.
