= Ossietzky Award =

Norwegian award for freedom of speech

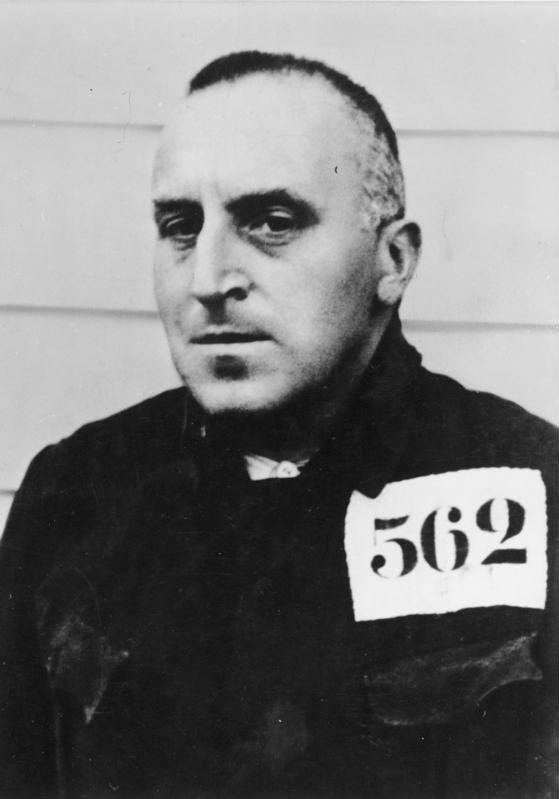
Carl von Ossietzky, author and Nobel Peace Prize Laureate, pictured as prisoner in Germany

The Ossietzky Award (Norwegian: Ossietzkyprisen) is a prize awarded by the Norwegian chapter of P.E.N., for extraordinary contributions to freedom of speech.

The prize is named after writer and Nobel Peace Prize laureate Carl von Ossietzky.

== Recipients ==
- Aziz Nesin (1993)
- Axel Jensen (1994)
- Johanna Schwarz (1995)
- Koigi wa Wamwere (1996)
- Haakon Børde (1997)
- Ketil Lund (1998)
- Wera Sæther (1999)
- Britt Karin Larsen (2000)
- Sigmund Strømme (2001)
- Elisabeth Eide (2002)
- Stavanger Municipality (2003)
- Aage Storm Borchgrevink (2004)
- Fakhra Salimi (2005)
- Ebba Haslund (2006)
- Democratic Voice of Burma (2007)
- Francis Sejersted and Chungdak Koren (2008)
- Mohammed Omer (2009)
- Mansour Koushan (2010)
- Mohammad Mostafaei (2011)
- Deeyah Khan (2012)
- Sidsel Mørck (2013)
- Sidsel Wold (2014)
- Irina Scherbakowa (2014)
- Ulrik Imtiaz Rolfsen (2015)
- Edward Snowden (2016)
- Tormod Heier (2017)
- Ahmedur Rashid Chowdhury (2018)
- Afshin Ismaeli (2019)
- Ahmed Falah, Finn Graff and Siri Dokken on behalf of satirists in Norway (2020)
- "Those who speak freely in Afghanistan" (2021)
- Shabana Rehman (2022)
- Julian Assange (2023)
- Odd Isungset (2024)
- Sami Abu Salem (2025)
