= Sigmund Strømme =

Norwegian literary scholar and publisher

- Born: 8 April 1923; Vardø, Norway
- Died: 26 March 2008 (aged 84); Oslo
- Occupations: literary scholar and publisher
- Awards: Ossietzky Award ( 2001)

Sigmund Strømme (8 April 1923 – 26 March 2008) was a Norwegian literary scholar and publisher.

== Biography ==
Strømme was born in Vardø in Finnmark, Norway. He was born to parish priest Sigvard Arnoldus Strømme and Helga Myhre, and was married to schoolteacher Inger-Johanne Hafsahl Karset. Strømme became cand.philol. in 1949. From 1955 he was assigned with the publishing house J. W. Cappelens Forlag, first as editor, from 1973 to 1987 as managing director (jointly with Jan Wiese, and then as chairman of the board from 1987 to 1997.

Strømme was board member of the Norwegian Publishers' Association, a member of the Norwegian Language Council (Norsk språkråd), board member of The Norwegian Book Club (Den norske Bokklubbenn) and board member of Nationaltheatret. He received the Ossietzky Award in 2001.

He died in Oslo in 2008.
