= Ragnar Kvam Jr. =

- Born: 23 September 1942 (age 83); Kvinesdal Municipality, Norway
- Occupations: Journalist, globetrotter, biographer and non-fiction writer
- Spouse: Sidsel Wold
- Father: Ragnar Kvam

Ragnar Kvam Jr. (born 23 September 1942) is a Norwegian journalist, globetrotter, biographer and non-fiction writer.

== Biography ==
Kvam was born in Kvinesdal Municipality and is a son of Ragnar Kvam. He is married to Sidsel Wold.

From 1974 to 1987 he was a journalist for the newspaper Dagbladet. He then initiated a period of sailing around the world, which eventually resulted in three books, Oppbrudd from 1990, Havet har meg nå from 1992, and En sjøreise til Sibir from 1996. He has written biographies of Hjalmar Johansen and other polar explorers, and his three-volume biography of Thor Heyerdahl earned him the Riksmålsforbundet's literary prize. He has also written a biography on painter and counterfeiter Knud Bull, who was deported from Great Britain to Australia in 1846.
