= Mohammad Mostafaei =

Iranian human rights lawyer (born 1974)

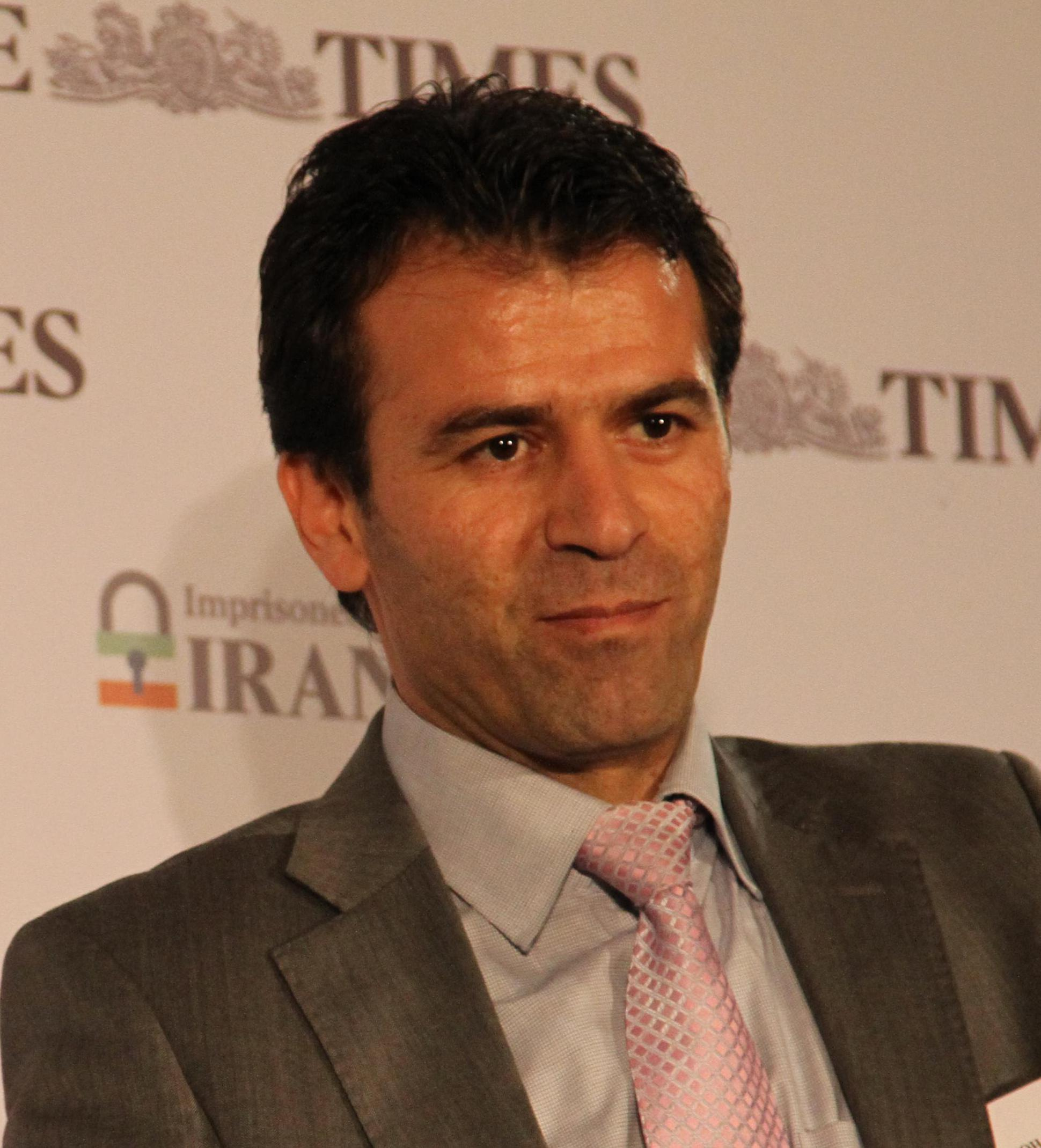
Mostafaei speaking at The Times' "Imprisoned in Iran" event.

Mohammad Mostafaei (Persian: محمد مصطفایی, born 1974) is an Iranian human rights lawyer specializing in death penalty cases, particularly those with juvenile defendants and other human rights cases. In 2010, he moved to Norway, having left Iran due to alleged persecution by authorities for his defense of Sakineh Mohammadi Ashtiani.

== Background ==
Mostafaei remembered his childhood as difficult due to his family's poverty and his father's extreme mood swings. At the age of 14, he attended a public hanging of "a very young man" and was profoundly disturbed by the sight, an incident he later credited with his decision to study law.

Mostafaei is married to Fereshteh Halimi. They have two daughters.

== Legal work ==
Mostafaei states that he appealed forty death sentences of juvenile defendants during his work in Iran, of which eighteen were overturned. Four of his clients were executed in 2008 and 2009.

Mostafaei became widely known for his work on human rights cases specially on death penalty and stoning cases in Iran and defense of Sakineh Mohammadi Ashtiani, a woman condemned to death by stoning for adultery. He wrote a series of blog posts on her case, attracting international attention and protest. The stoning sentence was commuted in July 2010 in the face of world pressure.

During the case, Mostafaei's wife, father-in-law, and brother-in-law were imprisoned in what Radio Free Europe/Radio Liberty described as "an apparent attempt to pressure him to back down." Mostafaei then illegally crossed the border into Turkey and sought asylum in Norway. The Norwegian government granted the asylum, Foreign Minister Jonas Gahr Støre calling Mostafaei "a courageous man who raises cases -- difficult cases -- which the authorities don't like". A Mostafaei stated that though the case had forced him to leave Iran, he felt he had made the right choice: "I had a nice house, a good job, nice office, a good car. Iran was my home but it was not important." He continued to work on human rights issues in Norway, describing himself as "maybe 10 times more [active]" than he had been in Iran.

In 2011, Norwegian PEN awarded Mostafaei its Ossietzky Award, an "annual prize for outstanding achievements in the field of free expression".

In 2012 Mohammad Mostafaei, established Universal Tolerance Organization (UTO) in Norway.
