= Rafah =

Palestinian city in southern Gaza Strip

Coordinates: 31°16′21″N 34°15′31″E

Rafah رفح
- City
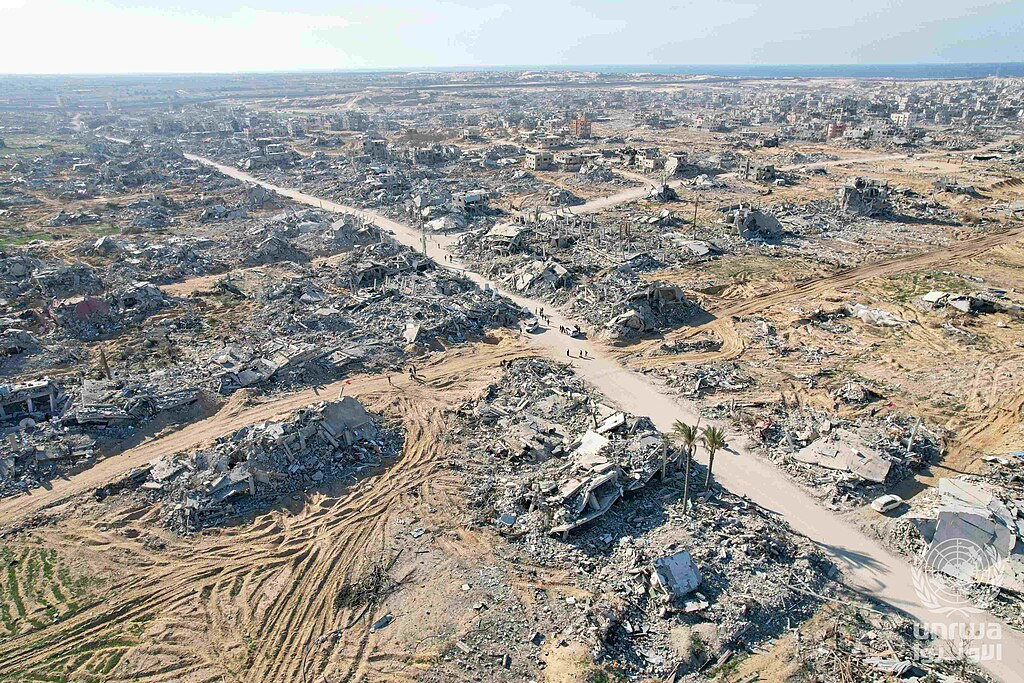
- Aerial view of the remains of Rafah in January 2025

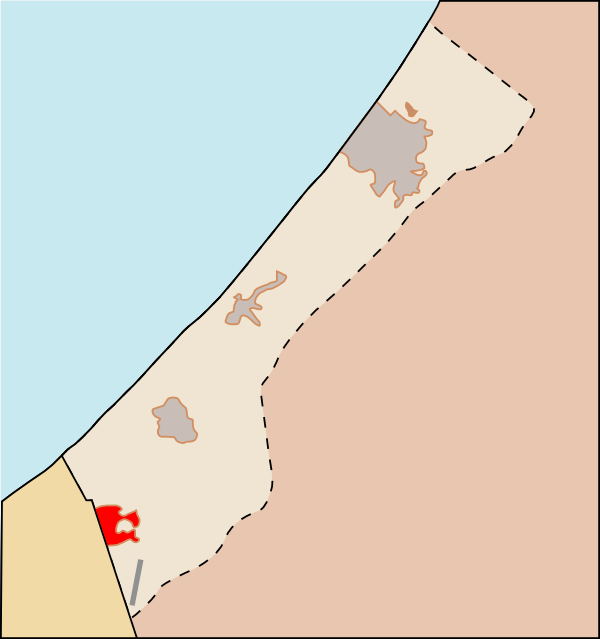
- Location of Rafah in the Gaza Strip
- Interactive map of Rafah
- Location of Rafah
- Palestine grid: 77/78
- State: Palestine
- Palestine: Rafah
- Control: (Palestine) National Committee for the Administration of Gaza; Israel

Government
  - Type: City
  - Head of Municipality: Anwar al-Shaer (2019)
  - Mayor: Ahmed al-Soufi (2025)

Area
  - Total: 64 km^{2} (25 sq mi)

Population (2017 Census)
  - Total: 171,899
  - Density: 2,700/km^{2} (7,000/sq mi)

Rafah (Arabic: رفح, romanized: Rafaḥ, pronounced [rafaħ]) is a largely destroyed and depopulated city in the southern Gaza Strip, Palestine, that serves as the capital of the Rafah Governorate. It is located 30 kilometers (19 mi) south-west of Gaza City. In 2017, Rafah had a population of 171,889. Due to the Gaza war, about 1.4 million people from Gaza City and Khan Yunis, about 70% of Gaza's population, were displaced to Rafah, as of February 2024. By April 2025, most of the city had been destroyed by Israeli forces and fell under Israeli control.

After the 1948 Palestine war, Egypt governed the area and refugee camps for displaced Palestinians who fled or were expelled from what became Israel were established. During the Suez Crisis in 1956, the Israel Defense Forces (IDF) killed 111 Palestinians, including 103 refugees in the Rafah refugee camp, during the 1956 Rafah massacre. During the 1967 Six-Day War, Israeli forces re-occupied the Sinai Peninsula and Gaza Strip after capturing them from Egypt. In the same year, IDF troops bulldozed and demolished 144 houses in the Rafah refugee camp, killing 23 Palestinians.

When Israel fully withdrew from the Sinai in 1982, Rafah was split into a Gazan part and an Egyptian part, separated by barbed-wire barriers. Then, since 2000, the core of the city was destroyed by Israel, and since the 2010s also by Egypt, in order to create a large buffer zone.

Rafah is the site of the Rafah Border Crossing, the sole crossing point between Egypt and the Gaza Strip. Gaza's only airport, Yasser Arafat International Airport, was located just south of the city. The airport operated from 1998 to 2001, when it was destroyed by Israeli forces.

== Etymology ==
r Z1 p w bH mDAt xAst
rpwḥw
in hieroglyphs
Era: New Kingdom
(1550–1069 BC)

Over the ages the city has been known as Rpwḥw by the ancient Egyptians, 𒊏𒉿𒄭 Rapiḫi or 𒊏𒉿𒄷 Rapiḫu by the Assyrians, Ῥαφία Rhaphíā by the Greeks, Raphia by the Romans, and Rafh by the Arab Caliphate. In Hebrew, the city is known as Rafiah (Hebrew: רפיח).

Raphiah was a pagan city where worship of Dionysus abounded, so much so that Stephanus of Byzantium, in his 6th century work Ethnika wrote that the city's name was derived from the Greek word ραφή (raphe, meaning "stitch"), because it referenced the birth of the Dionysus who was stitched into Zeus' thigh.

In English, Rafah (/ˈrɑːfə/ (US) or /ˈræfə/ (UK)), derived from the modern Arabic, is most common, but Rafiah /rəˈfiːə/ is also used. The form Raphiah /rəˈfaɪə/ is used as well, especially in historical contexts such as the Battle of Raphiah.

== History ==
Rafah was at the southern end of the Gaza Strip

=== Late Bronze Age ===
Rafah has a history stretching back thousands of years. It was first recorded in an inscription of Egyptian Pharaoh Seti I, from 1303 BCE as Raphia (Rph).

=== Iron Age ===
It was the first stop on Pharaoh Shoshenq I's campaign to the Levant in 925 BCE. In 720 BCE it was the site of the Assyrian king Sargon II's victory over the Egyptians.

=== Classical Age ===
==== Hellenistic period ====
In 217 BCE, the Battle of Raphia was fought between the victorious Ptolemy IV and Antiochus III. It is said to be one of the largest battles ever fought in the Levant, with over a hundred thousand soldiers and hundreds of elephants.

In 193 BC, Antiochus III, willing to make peace with Ptolemy V, had his daughter Cleopatra I marry Ptolemy V. Their marriage took place in Raphia.

==== Hasmonean and Roman period ====
The town was conquered by the King of Judea, Alexander Yannai (Alexander Jannaeus) by 100 BCE and held by the Hasmonean Jewish kingdom until the Roman conquest. Rafah was then rebuilt in the time of Pompey and Gabinius; the latter seems to have done the actual work of restoration for the era of the town from 57 BCE. Rafah is mentioned in Strabo (16, 2, 31), the Antonine Itinerary, and is depicted on the Map of Madaba.

=== Medieval Age ===
==== Byzantine period ====
During the Byzantine period, it was a diocese, and Byzantine ceramics and coins have been found there. It was represented at the Council of Ephesus 431 CE by Bishop Romanus, but today remains a titular see of the Roman Catholic Church; additionally, a small Greek Orthodox presence remains in Rapha.

=== Early Muslim to Mamluk periods ===
Rafah was one of the towns captured by the Rashidun army under general 'Amr ibn al-'As in 635 CE, and subsequently was an important trading city during the Early Muslim period. Under the Umayyads and Abbasids, Rafah was the southernmost border of Jund Filastin ("District of Palestine"). According to Arab geographer al-Ya'qubi, it was the last town in the Province of Syria and on the road from Ramla to Egypt.

In 1226, Arab geographer Yaqut al-Hamawi writes of Rafah's former importance in the early Arab period, saying it was "of old a flourishing town, with a market, and a mosque, and hostelries". However, he goes on to say that in its current state, Rafah was in ruins, but was an Ayyubid postal station on the road to Egypt after nearby Deir al-Balah.

=== Ottoman and Egyptian period ===
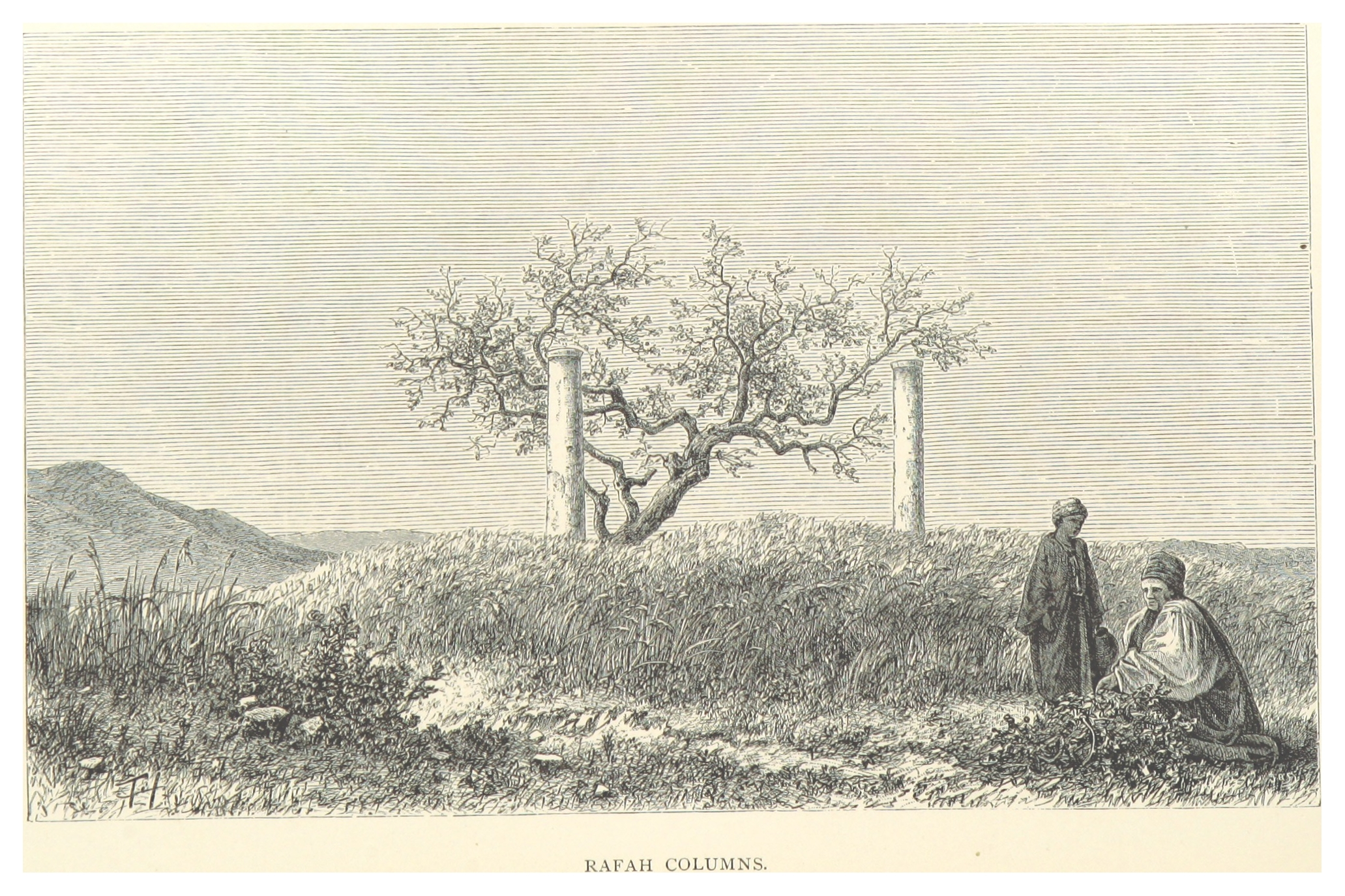
The columns of Rafah, on the road between Egypt and Syria, in 1881

Rafah appeared in the 1596 Ottoman tax registers as being in the Nahiya of Gaza of the Liwa of Gazza. It had a population of 15 households, all Muslim, who paid taxes on wheat, barley, summer crops, occasional revenues, goats and/or bee hives. In 1799, the French Army of the Orient, led by Napoleon, passed through Rafah during the French campaign in Egypt and Syria. Rafah was the boundary between the provinces of Egypt and Syria. In 1832, the area came under Egyptian occupation of Muhammad Ali, which lasted until 1840.

French explorer Victor Guérin, who visited Rafah in May 1863, noted two pillars of granite which the locals called Bab el Medinet, meaning "The Gate of the town". In 1881, Archduke Ludwig Salvator of Austria wrote: "Fragments of gray granite pillars, still standing, are here to be met with about the road, the fields, and the sand, and we saw one lying on the ground half buried... The pillars are the remains of an ancient temple, Raphia, and are of special importance in the eyes of the Arabs, who call them Rafah, as they mark the boundary between Egypt and Syria."

=== British period ===
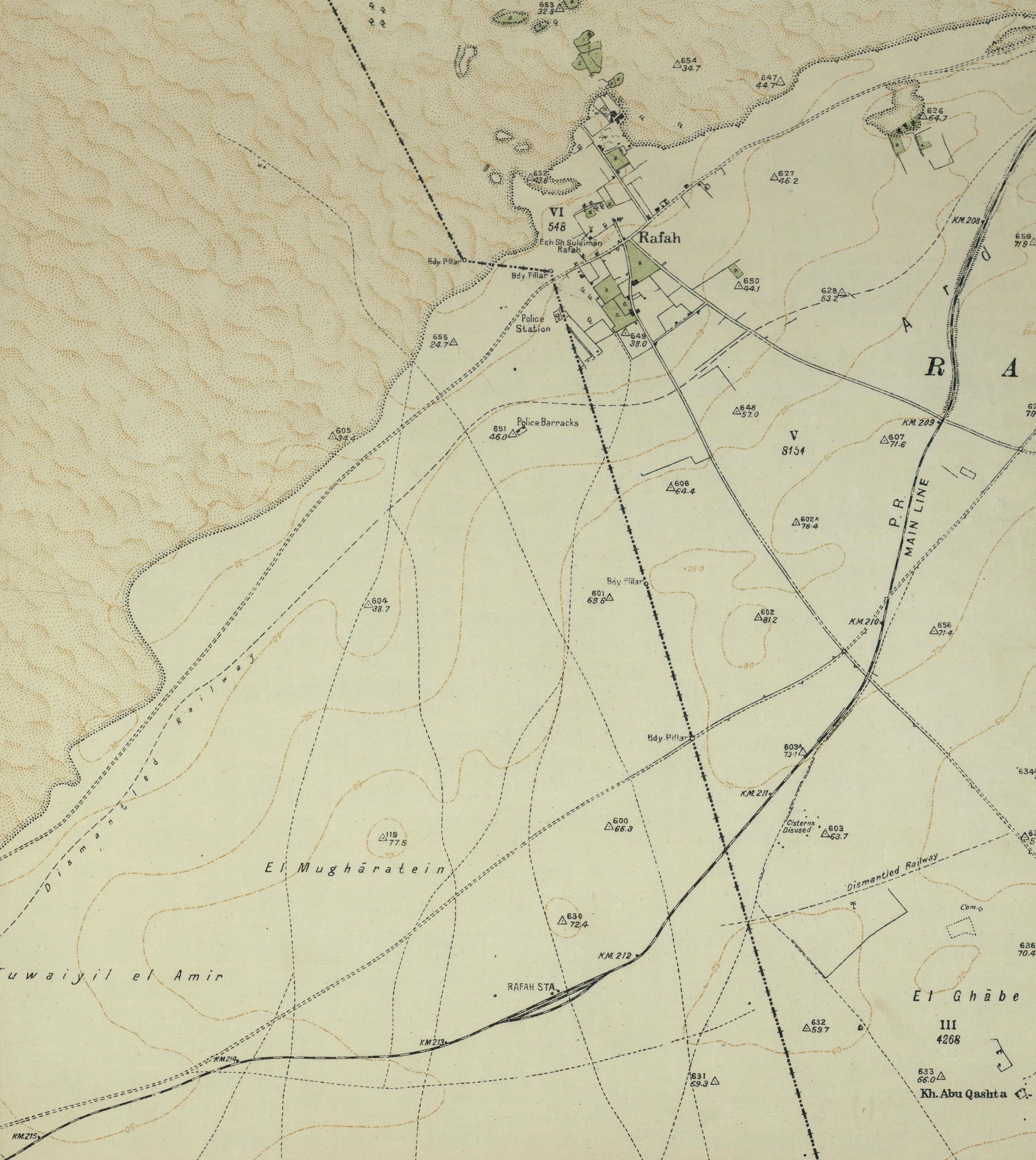
A map of Rafah in 1931

On 9 January 1917, British forces captured Rafah, and subsequently used it as a staging post for their first attempt to capture Gaza. The presence of British military bases in Rafah served an economic draw which led to an influx of internal migration to the city. In the 1922 census of Palestine conducted by the British Mandatory authorities, Rafah had a population of 599 inhabitants, all of which Muslim. Nine years later, the Mandatory authorities conducted the 1931 census of Palestine, by which time Rafah's population had increased to 1,423 residents living in 228 houses, all of which were still Muslim.

In the Village Statistics, 1945, a joint survey conducted by the Mandatory government's Government Office of Statistics and Department of Lands for the Anglo-American Committee of Inquiry, Rafah had an all-Muslim population of 2,220 people with 40,579 dunams of land. Of these, 275 dunams were plantations and irrigable land, 24,173 dunams were used for growing cereals, while 16,131 dunams were un-cultivable land.

=== 1948–1967 : under Egyptian control ===
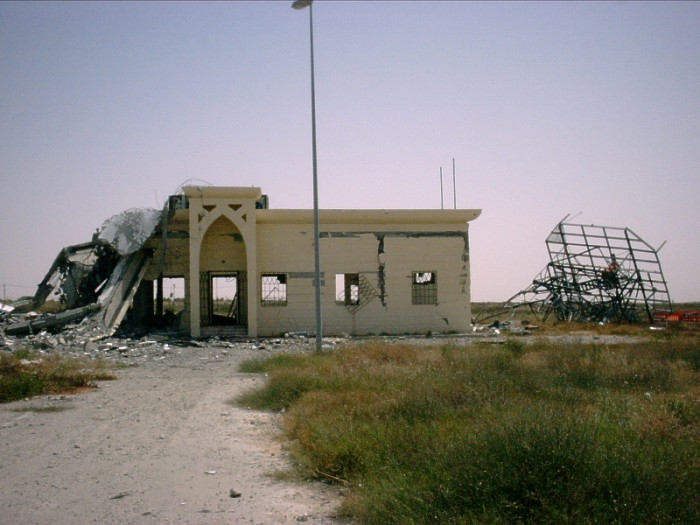
View of Yasser Arafat International Airport near Rafah which was destroyed by Israel during the Second Intifada.

After the 1948 Arab–Israeli War, Egypt governed the area (see Palestinian Protectorate) and refugee camps were established. During the Suez Crisis, 111 Palestinians, including 103 refugees, were killed by troops of the Israel Defence Force in the Palestinian refugee camp of Rafah, during the 1956 Rafah massacre. The United Nations was unable to determine the circumstances surrounding the deaths.

During the 1967 Six-Day War, Israeli forces captured Rafah as part of their invasion of the Sinai Peninsula and Gaza Strip. The population was about 55,000, of whom only 11,000 lived in Rafah itself. On Friday, 9 June 1967, the Israeli military bulldozed & blew up 144 houses in Rafah refugee camp, killing 23 Palestinians.

=== After 1967 : Israeli occupation and settlement ===
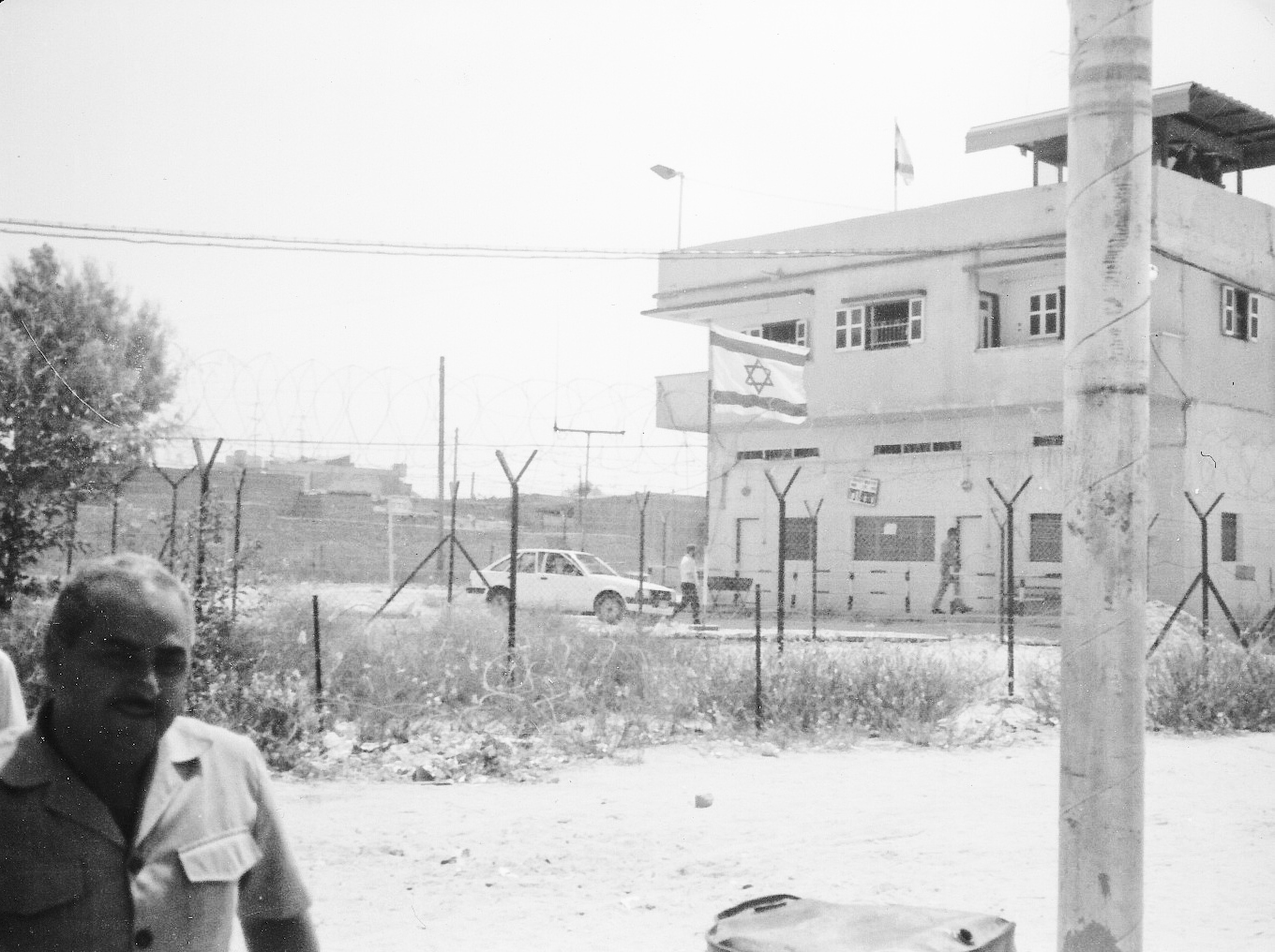
Building occupied by Israeli army in 1985

In the summer of 1971, the IDF, under General Ariel Sharon (then head of the IDF southern command), destroyed approximately 500 houses in the refugee camps of Rafah in order to create patrol roads for Israeli forces. These demolitions displaced nearly 4,000 people. Israel established the Brazil and Canada housing projects to accommodate displaced Palestinians and to provide better conditions in the hopes of integrating the refugees into the general population and its standard of living; Brazil is immediately south of Rafah, while Canada was just across the border in Sinai. Both were named because UN peacekeeping troops from those respective countries had maintained barracks in those locations. After the 1978 Camp David Accords mandated the repatriation of Canada project refugees to the Gaza Strip, the Tel al-Sultan project, northwest of Rafah, was built to accommodate them.

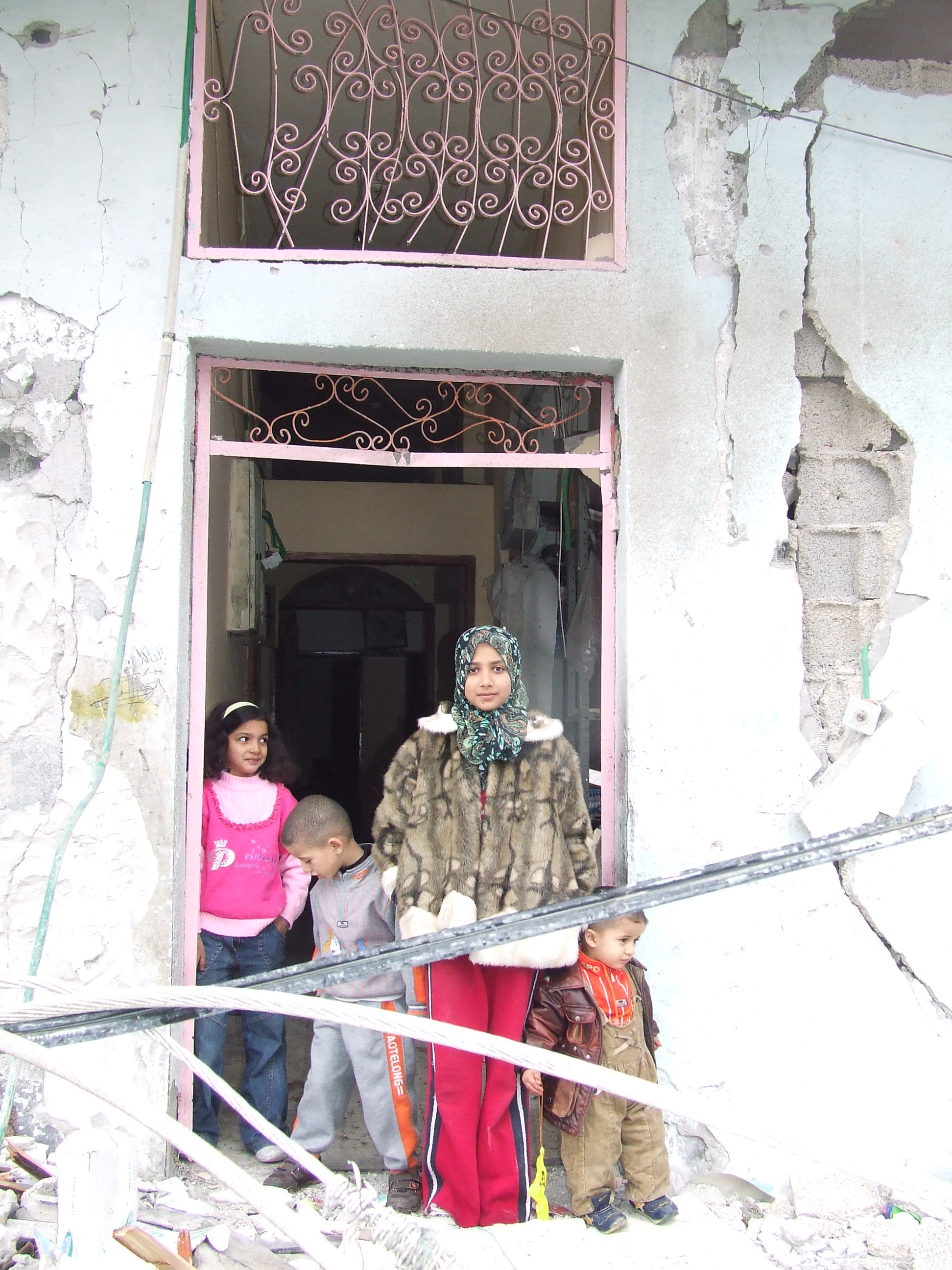
Palestinians after an Israeli airstrike on the Rafah refugee camp during the Gaza War (2008–2009)

During the early months of First Intifada on 25 April 1989 Rafah resident Khaled Musa Armilat, aged 22, was shot dead by Israeli soldiers in Khan Yunis. In a letter to a Member of Knesset, March 1990, Defence Minister Yitzhak Rabin stated that the dead man's brother had been interrogated and stated that he had been killed by Border Police but four months later he blamed the army. Rabin added the matter was being investigated by the Israeli Police. Three and a half weeks after Armilat's killing, 19 May, five civilians including a 50-year-old woman and a 13-year-old boy, were killed in Rafah by Israeli soldiers using plastic bullets. Two of the 12 other casualties later died of their wounds.

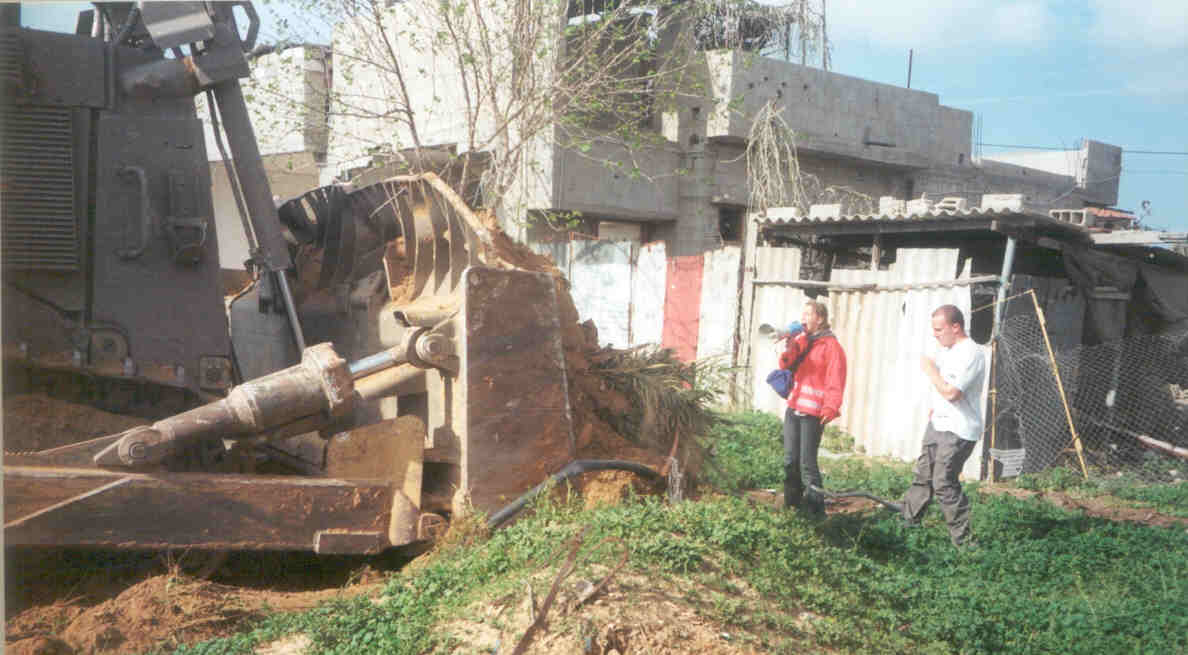
Rachel Corrie opposing the demolition of Palestinian homes by Israeli military bulldozers, a few hours before they ran her over

On 16 March 2003, American activist Rachel Corrie was killed in Rafah by being run over by an Israel Defense Forces bulldozer while trying to obstruct the demolition of a home.

In May 2004, the Israeli Government led by, then Prime Minister, Ariel Sharon approved another mass demolition of homes in Rafah. Therefore, he obtained the nickname "the bulldozer".

In September 2005, Israel withdrew its settlers and ground troops from the Gaza Strip but retained control of the skies, and land and sea borders. Moreover, Rafah remained divided, with part of it on the Egyptian side of the border under Egyptian rule. It has been claimed that it was in order to cope with the division of the town, that smugglers have made tunnels under the border, connecting the two parts and permitting the smuggling of goods and persons.

Israeli destructions during 2008-2009 Gaza War

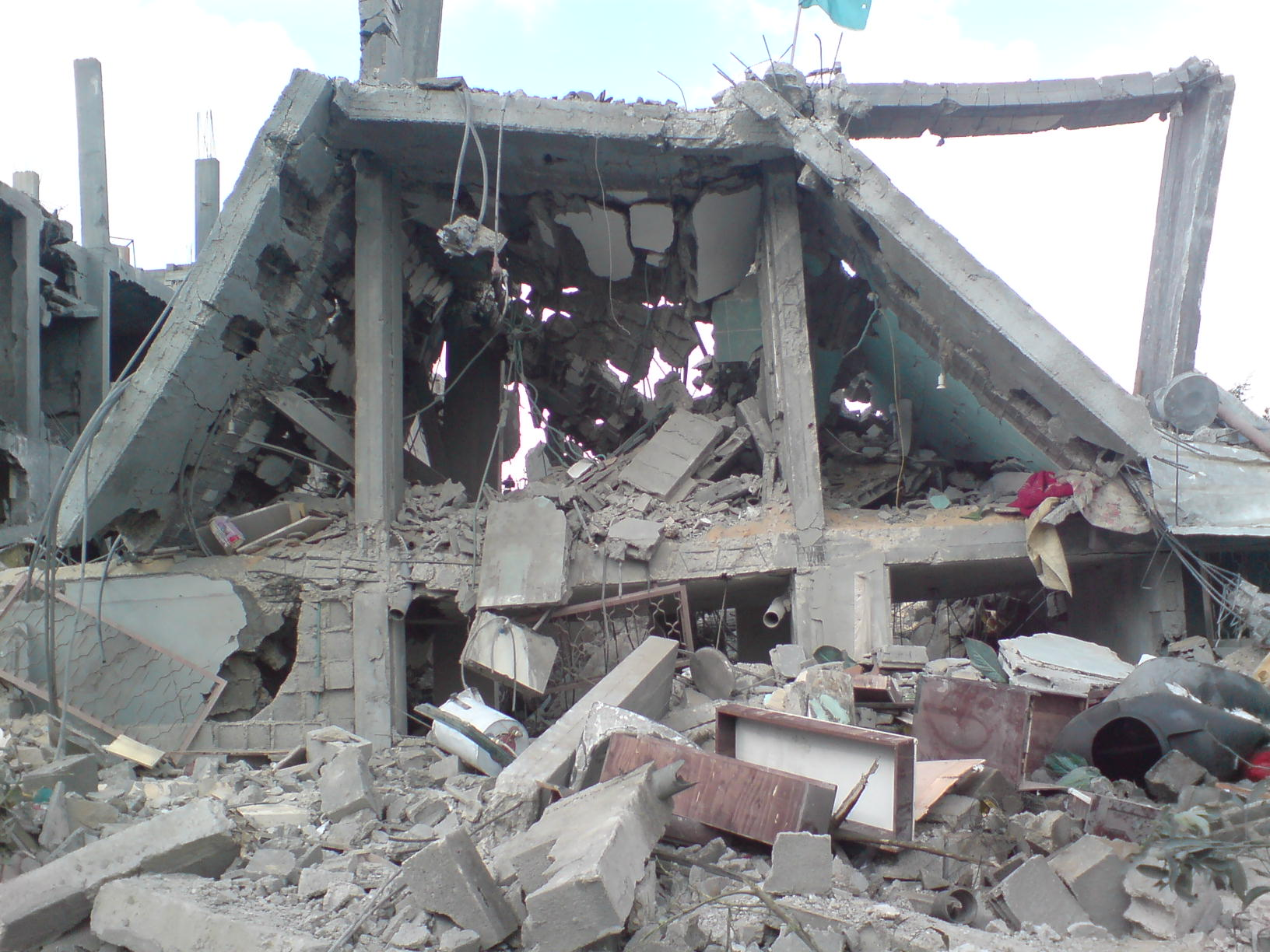

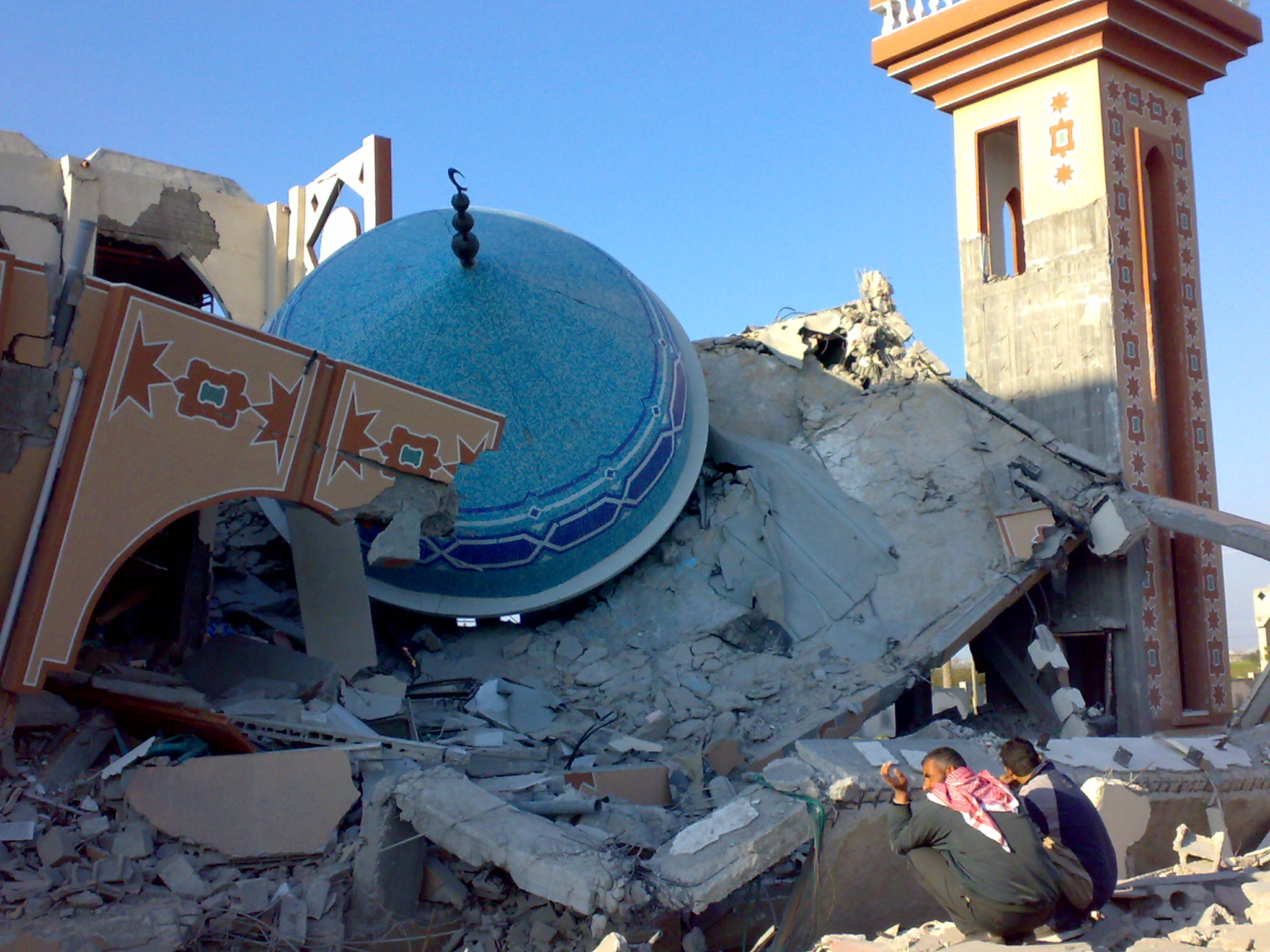

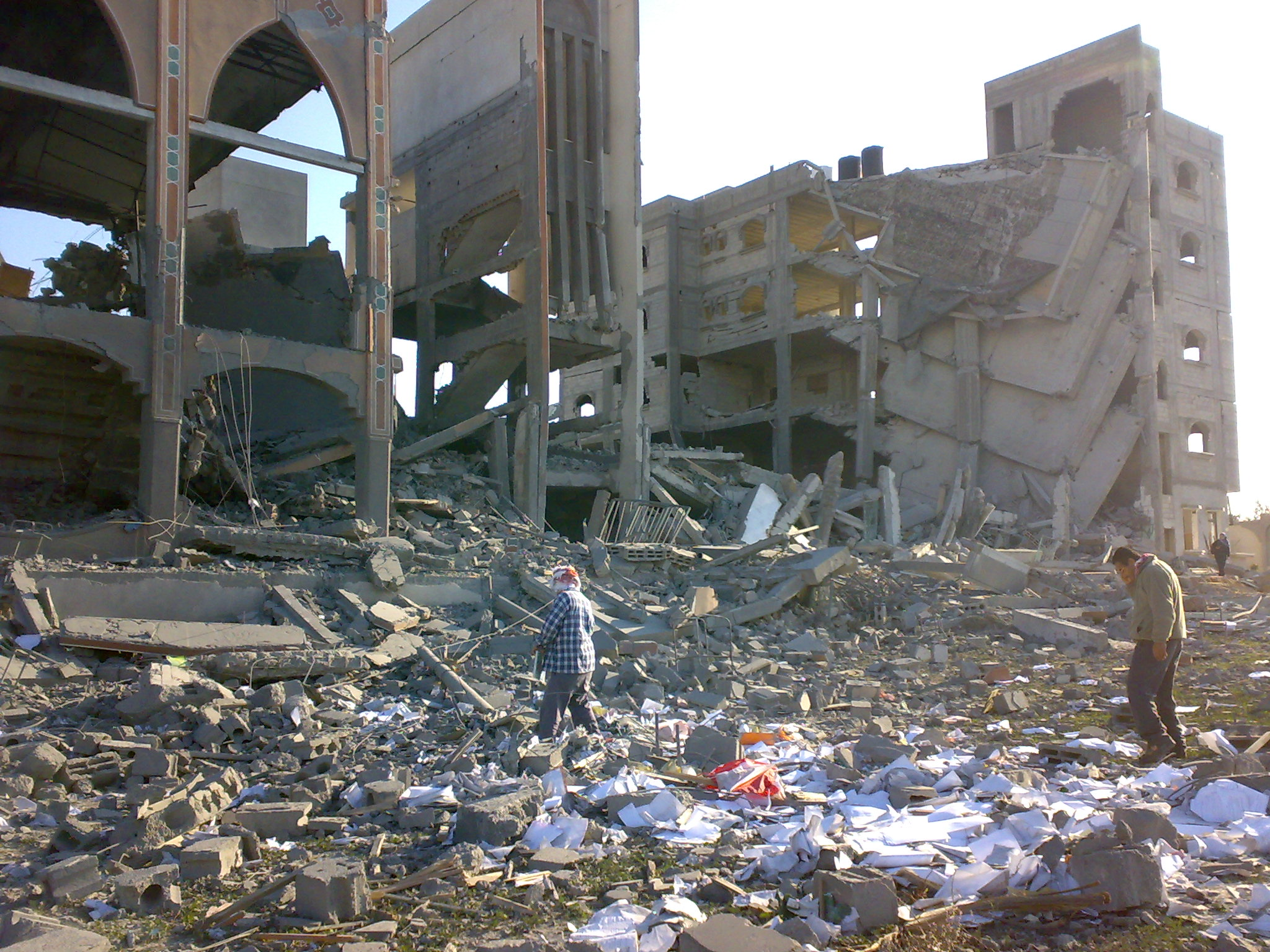

=== Gaza war ===
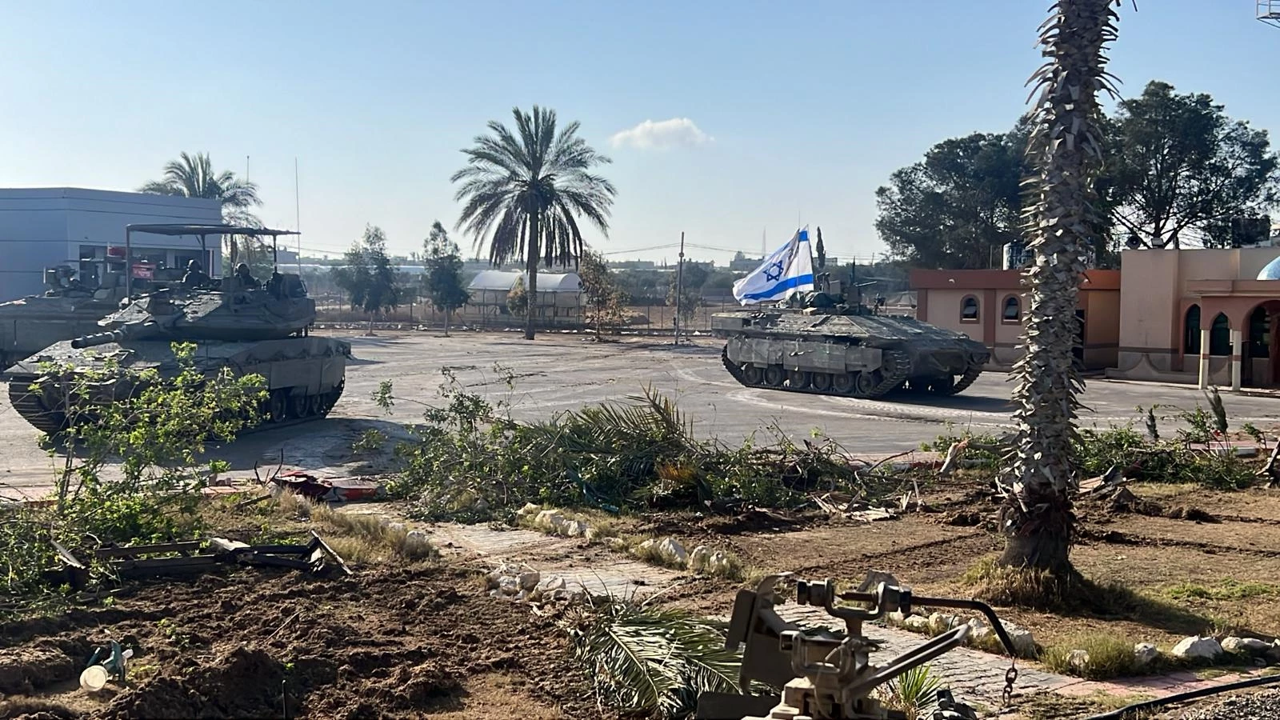
Israeli tanks in Rafah on May 7, 2024

During the Israeli Defence Forces' (IDF) war in Gaza, civilians were told to flee to Rafah and forcibly displaced from their homes. Although the Israeli government declared the southern half of Gaza a safe zone, the IDF proceeded to bomb the region extensively, with a New York Times investigation estimating that 2,000-pound bombs were dropped at least 200 times as of 21 December 2023.

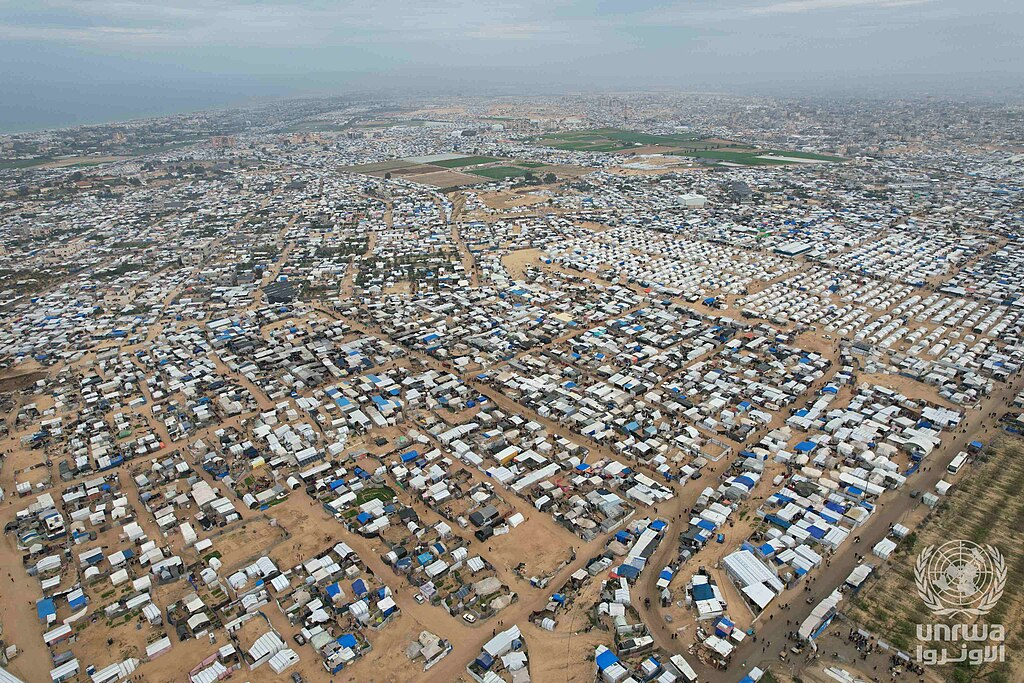
An aerial view of Al-Mawasi area where displaced Palestinians live in tents, January 2025

By February 2024, roughly two-thirds of Gaza's population, or 1.4 million people, had been forcibly displaced from other parts of the territory into Rafah, with the IDF declaring its intent to enter the city. Critics have warned about the potential for mass civilian casualties in the event of a ground invasion, with the UN secretary general António Guterres arguing that "Such an action would exponentially increase what is already a humanitarian nightmare with untold regional consequences." On 9 February, Benjamin Netanyahu ordered the IDF to create an evacuation plan to remove civilians before launching an offensive against Rafah which was the last major population center in the Gaza Strip still under Hamas control and the elimination of Hamas was considered to be impossible as long as the four Hamas battalions in Rafah are intact. Prior to the start of the ground invasion, Israel began to intensify its strikes on Rafah from the air. More than 44 people were killed in airstrikes on Rafah on 11 February, with many likely still under the rubble. Netanyahu continued to push for a ground invasion, saying that "We're going to do it....Victory is within reach".

On 11 February, The Wall Street Journal reported that Egypt had warned Hamas to release hostages within two weeks or face an IDF invasion of Rafah. A joint operation in Rafah by the IDF, Shin Bet, and Israel Police recovered two hostages (Fernando Marman and Luis Har) kidnapped by Hamas from Nir Yitzhak. During this operation, heavy bombardment by the IDF occurred in the area that includes many refugee camps killing 112 people with several bodies trapped under the rubble.

==== Razing and destruction ====
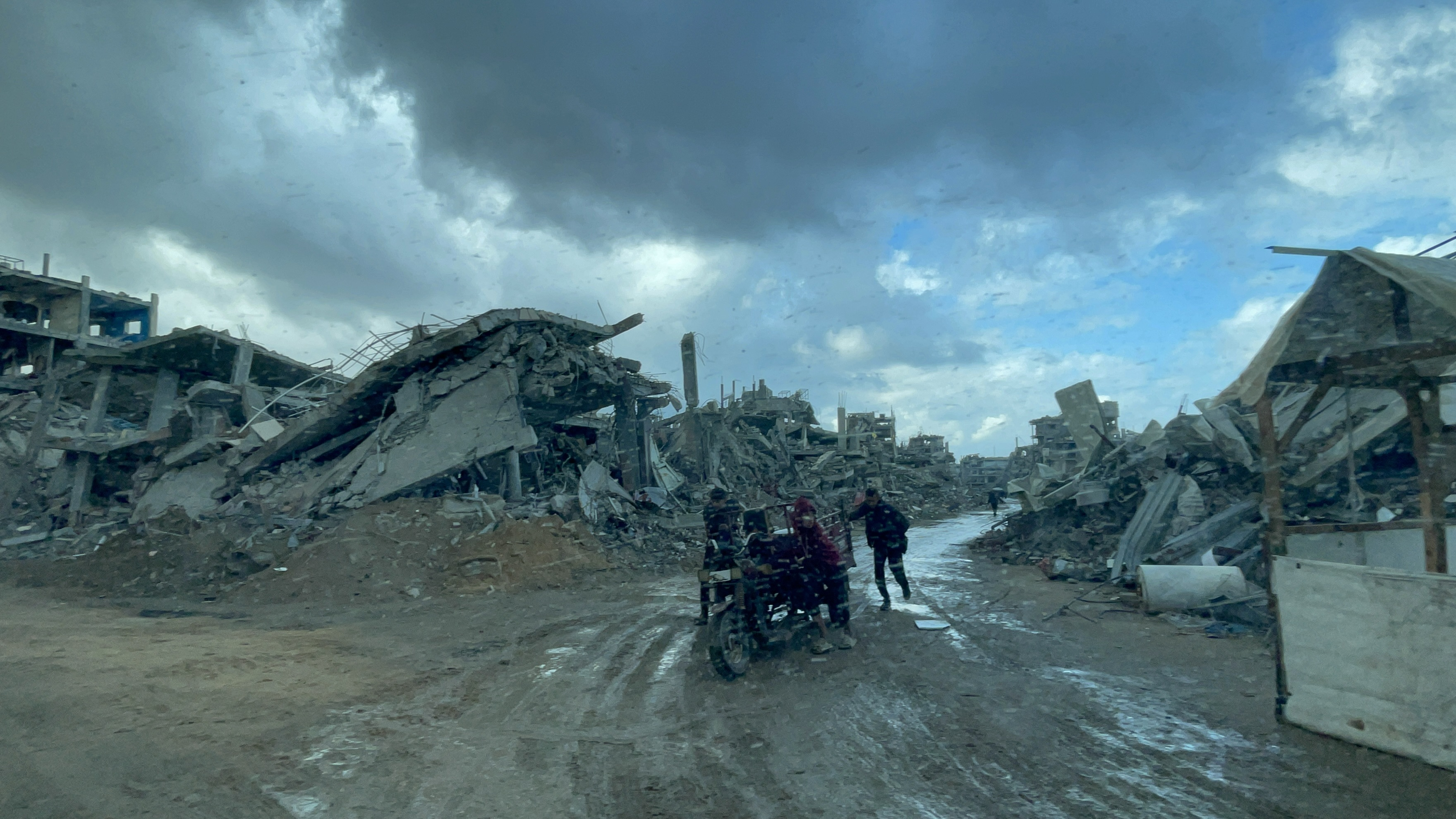
Ruins of Tel al-Sultan refugee camp, destroyed by Israeli army during Gaza war, February 2025

In previous operations, Israel destroyed buildings on the border with Egypt, arguing it as a military need to cut Hamas from possible supply roads. On 3 April 2025, about two weeks after the Gaza War resumed, the IDF advanced into Rafah as hundreds of thousands of Palestinians fled the city. It soon started massive operations to raze most of Rafah itself, flattening mosques, schools, greenhouses and even greenery. By mid May 2025, The New York Times reported with satellite images and on-the-ground video proofs that most of the city housing and buildings have been purposely razed by Israeli bulldozers or controlled demolitions. Side-by-side satellite imagery of the Shaboura neighborhood show it with all its pre-war buildings, then in its early-2025 state of widespread destruction, and then on 3 May 2025 with nearly all its buildings razed to the ground. The same was visible for most of the city. In July 2026, it was reported that Israel was "virtually erasing" Rafah.

At the same time, a new road extending from the Israeli border called the Morag Corridor has been constructed, connecting it to Rafah's agricultural lands, along with new Israeli military outposts.

== Development ==
The Ottoman–British agreement of 1 October 1906 established a boundary between Ottoman-ruled Palestine and British-ruled Egypt, from Taba to Rafah. After World War I, Palestine was also under British control, but the Egypt-Palestine Boundary was maintained to control movement of the local Bedouin. During the mid-1930s, the British enhanced the border control and Rafah evolved as a small boundary town that functioned as a trade and services centre for the semi-settled Beduin population. During World War II, it became an important British base.

Following the Armistice Agreement of 24 February 1949, Rafah was located in Egypt-occupied Gaza and consequently, a Gaza–Egypt border no longer existed. Rafah could grow without any consideration being taken of the old 1906 international boundary. In the 1967 Six-Day War, Israel conquered the Sinai Peninsula and the Gaza Strip from Egypt and all of the city was now under Israeli occupation.

In 1979, Israel and Egypt signed a peace treaty that returned the Sinai, which borders the Gaza Strip, to Egyptian control. In the Peace Treaty, the re-created Gaza–Egypt border was drawn across the city of Rafah. Rafah was divided into an Egyptian and a Palestinian part, splitting up families, separated by barbed-wire barriers. Families were separated, property was divided and many houses and orchards were cut across and destroyed by the new boundary, bulldozed, allegedly for security reasons. Rafah became one of the three border points between Egypt and Israel.

== Demographics ==
In 1922, Rafah's population was 599, which increased to 1,423 in 1931, increasing again to 1,635 in 1938, and further increased to 2,220 in 1945. In 1982, the total population was approximately 10,800.

In the 1997 Palestinian Central Bureau of Statistics (PCBS) census, Rafah and its adjacent camp had a combined population of 91,181, Tall as-Sultan was listed with a further 17,141. Refugees made up 80.3% of the entire population. In the 1997 census, Rafah's (together with Rafah camp) gender distribution was 50.5% male and 49.5% female.

In the 2006 PCBS estimate, Rafah city had a population of 71,003, Rafah camp and Tall as-Sultan form separate localities for census purposes, having populations of 59,983 and 24,418, respectively.

== Rafah Border Crossing ==
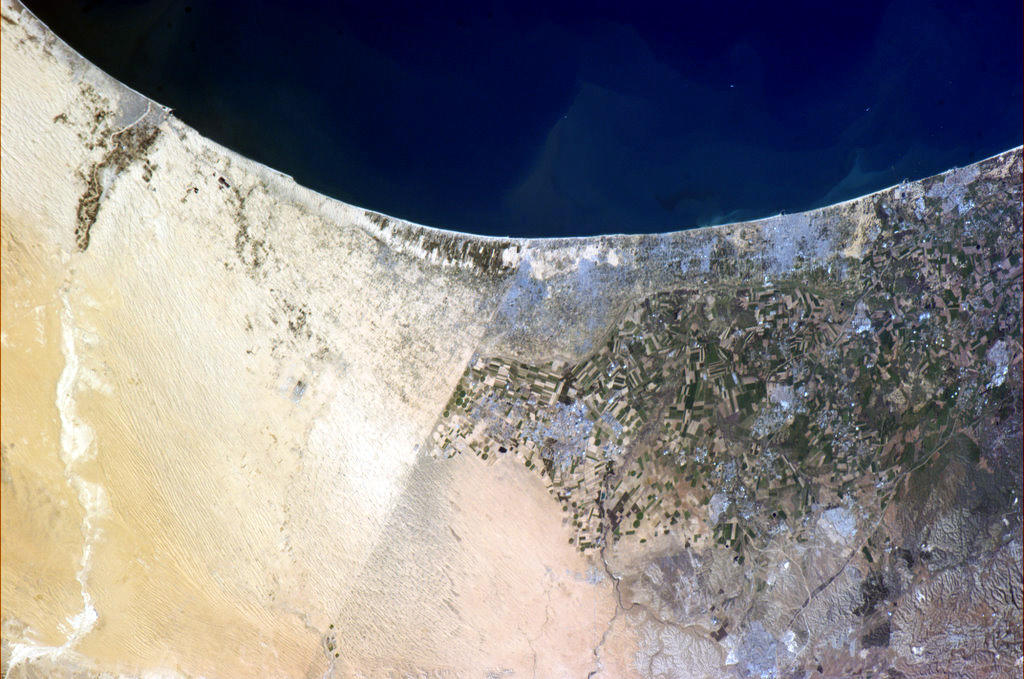
The city of Rafah lies on the border of Egypt and the Gaza Strip

Rafah is the site of the Rafah Border Crossing, the sole crossing between the Gaza Strip and Egypt. Formerly operated by Israeli military forces, control of the crossing was transferred to the Palestinian Authority in September 2005 as part of the larger Israeli withdrawal from the Gaza Strip. A European Union commission began monitoring the crossing in November 2005 amid Israeli security concerns, and in April 2006, Palestinian Authority chairman Mahmoud Abbas's Presidential Guard assumed responsibility for the site on the Palestinian Authority side. On the Egyptian side, the responsibility is assumed by the 750 Border Guards as per the agreement signed by Egypt and Israel in November 2005.

Following the ceasefire between Hamas and Israel, Israel announced on October 14, 2025, that the Rafah crossing would remain closed, with no date set for its reopening. This has restricted the entry of aid.

== Climate ==
Köppen-Geiger climate classification system classifies its climate as hot semi-arid (BSh).

Climate data for Rafiah, Gaza Strip
Month	Jan	Feb	Mar	Apr	May	Jun	Jul	Aug	Sep	Oct	Nov	Dec	Year
Mean daily maximum °C (°F)	17.4 (63.3)	18.1 (64.6)	20.5 (68.9)	23 (73)	25.8 (78.4)	28.3 (82.9)	29.6 (85.3)	30.5 (86.9)	29.1 (84.4)	27.6 (81.7)	23.8 (74.8)	19.4 (66.9)	24.4 (75.9)
Daily mean °C (°F)	12.9 (55.2)	13.6 (56.5)	15.6 (60.1)	18.1 (64.6)	20.9 (69.6)	23.6 (74.5)	25.2 (77.4)	26 (79)	24.7 (76.5)	22.6 (72.7)	18.7 (65.7)	14.8 (58.6)	19.7 (67.5)
Mean daily minimum °C (°F)	8.4 (47.1)	9.1 (48.4)	10.8 (51.4)	13.3 (55.9)	16.1 (61.0)	19 (66)	20.9 (69.6)	21.6 (70.9)	20.3 (68.5)	17.6 (63.7)	13.7 (56.7)	10.2 (50.4)	15.1 (59.1)
Average precipitation mm (inches)	48 (1.9)	36 (1.4)	27 (1.1)	6 (0.2)	4 (0.2)	0 (0)	0 (0)	0 (0)	0 (0)	8 (0.3)	39 (1.5)	53 (2.1)	221 (8.7)
Source: Climate-Data.org (altitude: 45 m)

Climate data for Rafah, North Sinai
Month	Jan	Feb	Mar	Apr	May	Jun	Jul	Aug	Sep	Oct	Nov	Dec	Year
Mean daily maximum °C (°F)	17.2 (63.0)	18 (64)	20.3 (68.5)	22.9 (73.2)	25.8 (78.4)	28.2 (82.8)	29.6 (85.3)	30.5 (86.9)	29 (84)	27.4 (81.3)	23.7 (74.7)	19.3 (66.7)	24.3 (75.7)
Daily mean °C (°F)	12.7 (54.9)	13.5 (56.3)	15.4 (59.7)	18 (64)	20.8 (69.4)	23.5 (74.3)	25.2 (77.4)	25.9 (78.6)	24.5 (76.1)	22.4 (72.3)	18.6 (65.5)	14.7 (58.5)	19.6 (67.3)
Mean daily minimum °C (°F)	8.2 (46.8)	9 (48)	10.6 (51.1)	13.2 (55.8)	15.9 (60.6)	18.8 (65.8)	20.8 (69.4)	21.4 (70.5)	20 (68)	17.4 (63.3)	13.5 (56.3)	10.1 (50.2)	14.9 (58.8)
Average precipitation mm (inches)	49 (1.9)	37 (1.5)	28 (1.1)	6 (0.2)	4 (0.2)	0 (0)	0 (0)	0 (0)	0 (0)	8 (0.3)	39 (1.5)	54 (2.1)	225 (8.8)
Source: Climate-Data.org (altitude: 78 m)

== See also ==
- Rafah, Egypt
- Gaza–Israel barrier
- Egypt–Gaza border
- Erez Crossing
- Philadelphi Corridor

== Bibliography ==
- Archduke of Austria, Ludwig Salvator (1881). The Caravan Route between Egypt and Syria. London: Chatto & Windus.
- Barron, J. B., ed. (1923). Palestine: Report and General Abstracts of the Census of 1922. Government of Palestine.
- Dauphin, C. (1998). La Palestine byzantine, Peuplement et Populations. BAR International Series 726 (in French). Vol. III : Catalogue. Oxford: Archeopress. ISBN 0-86054-905-4.
- Dwyer, Philip (2007). Napoleon -The Path To Power 1769–1799. Bloomsbury. ISBN 978-0-7475-7490-3.
- Government of Palestine, Department of Statistics (1945). Village Statistics, April, 1945.
- Guérin, V. (1869). Description Géographique Historique et Archéologique de la Palestine (in French). Vol. 1: Judee, pt. 2. Paris: L'Imprimerie Nationale.
- Hadawi, S. (1970). Village Statistics of 1945: A Classification of Land and Area ownership in Palestine. Palestine Liberation Organization Research Center. Archived from the original on 8 December 2018.
- Hütteroth, W.-D.; Abdulfattah, K. (1977). Historical Geography of Palestine, Transjordan and Southern Syria in the Late 16th Century. Erlanger Geographische Arbeiten, Sonderband 5. Erlangen, Germany: Vorstand der Fränkischen Geographischen Gesellschaft. ISBN 3-920405-41-2.
- Mills, E., ed. (1932). Census of Palestine 1931. Population of Villages, Towns and Administrative Areas. Jerusalem: Government of Palestine.
- Polybius 18.51.10 and 28.20.9; Livy 33.40.3 and 35.13.4; Appian, Syriaca 3.13 and 5.18.
- Strange, le, G. (1890). Palestine Under the Moslems: A Description of Syria and the Holy Land from A.D. 650 to 1500. Committee of the Palestine Exploration Fund.
