= Rafah Camp =

- Refugee Camp

Arabic transcription(s)
  - Arabic: مخيم رفح or معسكر رفح
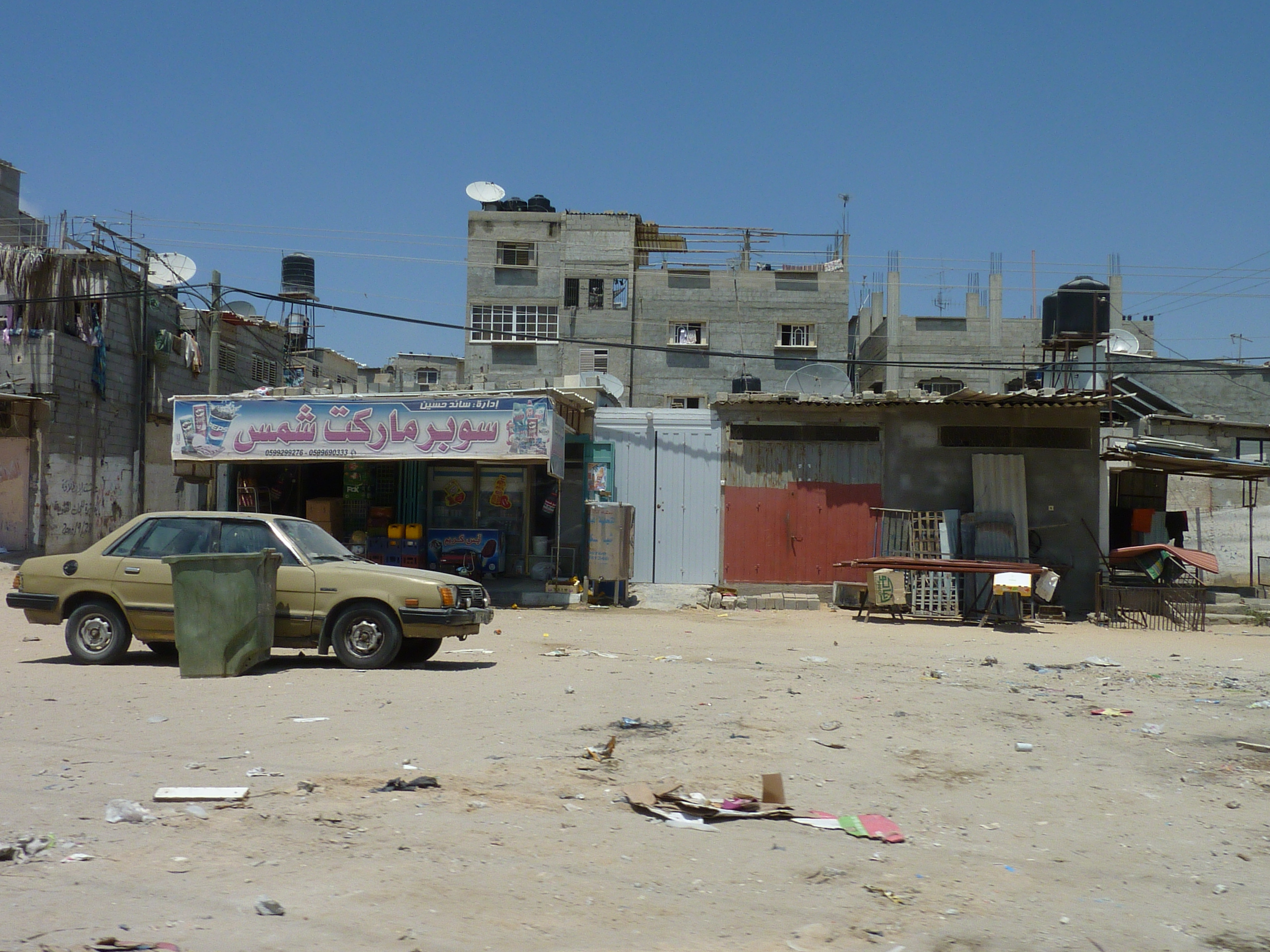

- Location of Rafah Camp within Palestine
- Coordinates: 31°16′58.87″N 34°15′11.52″E
- State: State of Palestine
- Governorate: Rafah

Government
  - Type: Refugee Camp (from 1949)
  - Control: Israel

Population (2017)
  - Total: 36,550

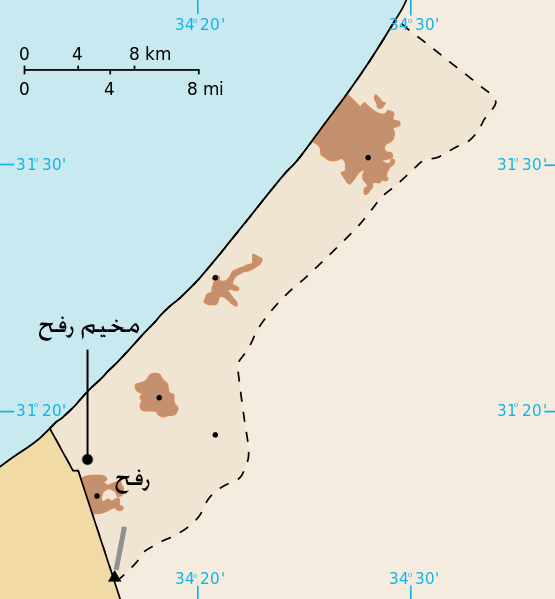
Rafah camp

Rafah Camp (Arabic: مخيم رفح or معسكر رفح) is one of eight Palestinian refugee camps in the Gaza Strip. It is located in the Rafah Governorate along the Gaza–Egypt border. It was established in 1949 and currently forms part of the city of Rafah. During the period of its establishment, it was the largest refugee camp in the Gaza Strip; however its population has decreased due to migration to the Tall as-Sultan camp, an extension of Rafah camp, which was set up to absorb refugees repatriated from Canada Camp.

According to the UNRWA, the camp has a population of 99,000 inhabitants, This figure includes (in contrast to PCBS census data) Tall as-Sultan. The Palestinian Central Bureau of Statistics 2017 census listed 36,550 residents in the camp. The camp is the second largest refugee camp in Palestine. There are 31 schools (20 primary, 11 secondary) run by the UNRWA.
