= Fouad Abu Butihan =

Palestinian politician (1969–2023)

- فؤاد علي سليمان أبو بطيحان

Personal details
- Born: Fouad Ali Suleiman Abu Butihan; 7 March 1969 Palestine
- Died: 17 October 2023 (aged 54) Nuseirat refugee camp, Gaza Strip
- Political party: Hamas

Military service
- Rank: Major general
- Battles/wars: Gaza war

Fouad Ali Suleiman Abu Butihan (Arabic: فؤاد علي سليمان أبو بطيحان; 7 March 1969 – 17 October 2023) was a Palestinian government official and the Hamas-government-appointed head of the Border and Crossing Authority in Gaza.

== Biography ==
Butihan was a major general and had previously served as colonel and Director General for the Palestinian Directorate of Rehabilitation and Reform. He was killed at his residence in the Nuseirat refugee camp in an airstrike during the Israeli bombardment of the Gaza Strip. At the time of his death, Butihan was the Hamas-appointed head of the Border and Crossing Authority in Gaza.

According to Hamas, Butihan had spent time in Israel prisons for his involvement in armed activity against Israel.

== See also ==
- Casualties of the 2023 Israel–Hamas war
- Fayek Mabhouh
