= Blockade of the Gaza Strip =

Restriction of movement and trade by Israel and Egypt (2007–present)

- Map of the blockaded Gaza Strip, with Israeli/Egyptian-controlled borders and limited fishing zone, September 2023
- Date: General blockade: June 2007 – present Intensified blockade: October 2023 – present
- Duration: 19 years, 5 months
- Location: Gaza Strip
- Motive: Isolate Hamas after its takeover, prevent weapons smuggling and attacks, and exert economic and political pressure
- Participants: Israeli security forces Egyptian Border Guard

The blockade of the Gaza Strip is an ongoing land, air, and sea blockade imposed by Israel regulating the movement of people and goods into and out of the Gaza Strip. Exit and entry into Gaza by sea or air is prohibited, and Israel controls two of Gaza's three border crossings, while Egypt controls the Rafah crossing on Gaza's southern border. Israel's stated aims are to prevent the smuggling of weapons and dual-use materials into Gaza, halt rocket attacks, and exert economic and political pressure on Hamas.

Israeli restrictions on movement and goods in the Gaza Strip date to the early 1990s, during its military occupation of the Gaza Strip (1967–2005), with intermittent blockades in 2005–2006. In June 2007, after Hamas seized control of the Gaza Strip, Israel significantly intensified existing restrictions and imposed an indefinite blockade that remains in place, citing the departure of Fatah and Palestinian Authority security forces, the need to hold Hamas accountable for rocket attacks on Israeli territory, and the aim of constraining its ability to govern Gaza. In the same year, Egypt closed the Rafah border crossing. Israel further tightened the blockade following the start of the Gaza war in October 2023.

Israel regulates Palestinians' movement through the Erez Crossing, with applications considered only for merchants, workers, and limited medical and humanitarian reasons. Before the Gaza war, exits via Erez averaged about 40,000 monthly. Imports are heavily restricted, with "dual use" items (including construction material and computer equipment) permitted only as part of donor projects. Israel's ban on virtually all exports from the Strip remains the main impediment to Gaza's sustainable economic development. Israel has also been accused of failing to fulfill obligations under various ceasefire agreements to ease or lift the blockade.

While the blockade's legality has not been adjudicated in court, human rights groups, international community representatives, and legal professionals have decried it as a form of collective punishment in contravention of international law, specifically the Fourth Geneva Convention, as it restricts the flow of essential goods, contributes to economic hardship, and limits Gazans' freedom of movement. Rights groups have held Israel mainly responsible as the occupying power. The land, sea, and air blockade isolated Gaza from the rest of the occupied Palestinian territory and the world, leading to the territory being called an "open-air prison".

== Background ==
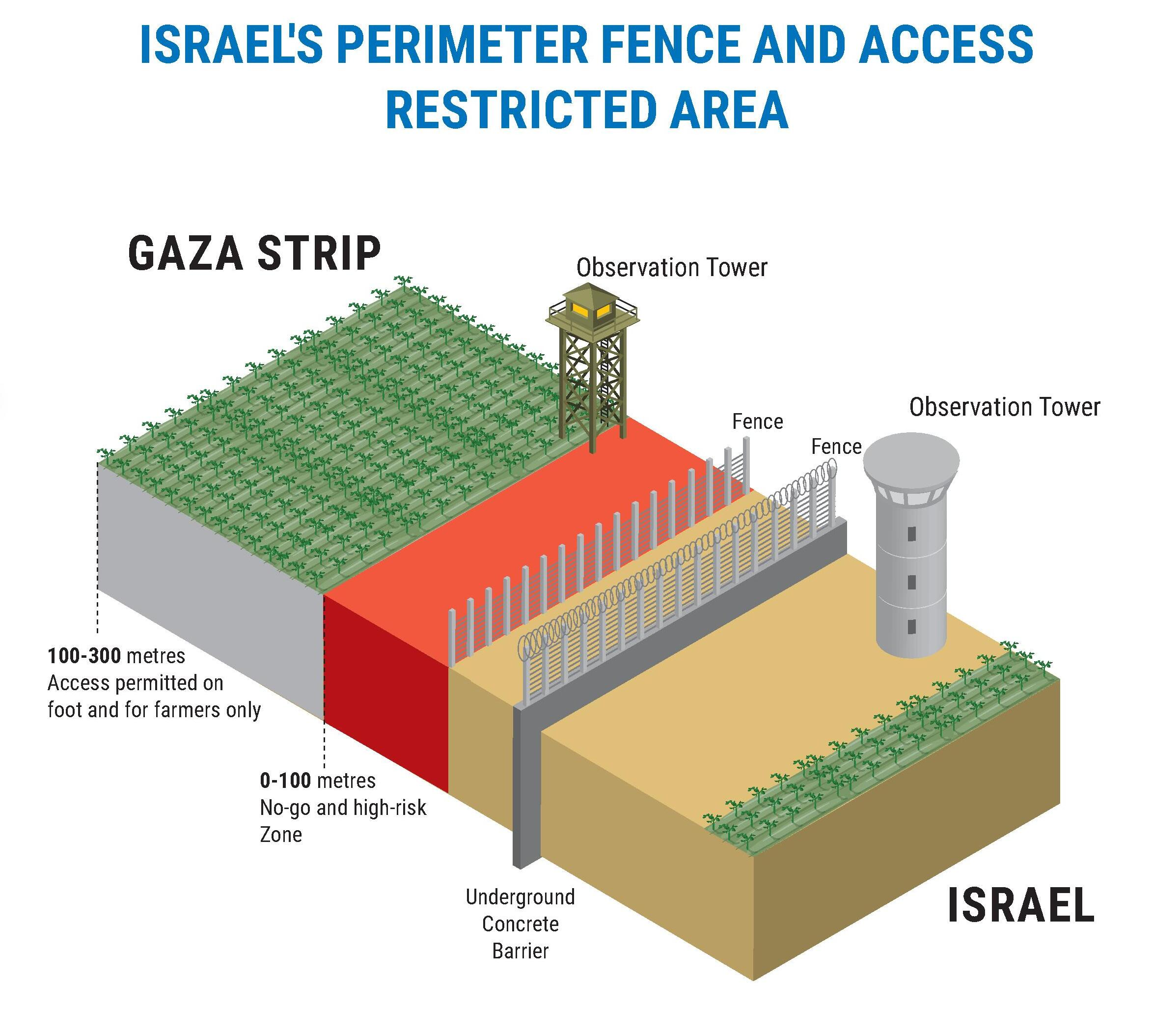
Section of the Gaza border with Israel showing restrictions, September 2023.

Israeli imposed closure on the movement of goods and people to and from Gaza dates back to 1991 when Israel cancelled the general exit permit for Palestinians in the occupied territories. This policy was initially temporary, but developed into a permanent administrative measure in March 1993 after heightened levels of violence by Palestinians inside Israel. Since then, the closure has become an institutionalized system in Gaza (and the West Bank), and has varied in intensity but never been completely lifted. As the closure was coming into place, academics and diplomats were already describing it as a form of collective punishment, a trend that continues in more recent times. For example, between 1993 and 1996, total closure was imposed on the Gaza Strip for a cumulative 342 days. During periods of total closure, Israel enforced a complete ban on any movement of people or goods between Gaza and Israel, the West Bank and foreign markets. The economic impact of these closures during 1996 alone was estimated by the World Bank as amounting to losses of almost 40% of Gaza's GNP. In 1994, Israel built the Gaza–Israel barrier as a security measure, despite this, Israeli security establishment has described the closure as having limited value against extremist attacks. Since then, there are four border crossings between Israel and the Gaza Strip through the barrier: the Kerem Shalom, Karni, Erez, and Sufa crossings. All goods bound for Gaza as well as exports passing through Israel must use one of these crossings, and undergo security inspection before being permitted to enter or leave Gaza.

In 2005, Israel withdrew its settlers and forces from the Gaza Strip, redeploying its military along the border. Following Hamas' electoral victory and subsequent military confrontation with opposing party Fatah which led to Hamas taking control over all of Gaza in 2007, Israel further tightened restrictions in an attempt to exert economic pressure on Hamas. With this new tightening of restrictions, all trade was ceased and the entrance of goods was limited to a "humanitarian minimum", allowing only those good which are "essential to the survival of the civilian population". Israeli security officials have described the ban on exports as "a political decision to separate Gaza from the West Bank" further describing it as a matter of "political-security" and a form of "economic warfare".

Additionally, starting in 2009, Egypt built an underground Egypt–Gaza barrier along the Egypt–Gaza border. The stated aim was to block smuggling tunnels. The Rafah Border Crossing is the only lawful crossing point between Egypt and Gaza, and was manned by PA security forces and the European Union Border Assistance Mission Rafah. All humanitarian and other supplies passing through Israel or Egypt must pass through these crossings after security inspection.

Until 2013, there were hundreds of smuggling tunnels dug under the Egypt-Gaza border to smuggle goods, including fuel, into Gaza to bypass the blockade.

=== 2005–2006 blockades ===
On 12 September 2005, the final day of the Israeli withdrawal, international politicians such as France's foreign minister Philippe Douste-Blazy and Jordan's deputy prime minister Marwan Muasher warned of Gaza being turned into an open-air prison. Four days later, Mahmoud Abbas told the UN General Assembly:

It is incumbent upon Israel to turn this unilateral withdrawal into a positive step in a real way. We must quickly resolve all outstanding major issues, including the Rafah border crossing with Egypt, the airport and the seaport, as well as the establishment of a direct link between the Gaza Strip and the West Bank. Without this, Gaza will remain a huge prison.

Following the disengagement, human rights groups alleged that Israel frequently blockaded Gaza in order to apply pressure on the population "in response to political developments or attacks by armed groups in Gaza on Israeli civilians or soldiers". The special envoy of the Quartet James Wolfensohn noted that security measures made the passage of goods into Gaza slow, that "incidents of violence by the Palestinians and vigorous reprisals by the Israelis" were happening, and that "Gaza had been effectively sealed off from the outside world since the Israeli disengagement [August–September 2005], and the humanitarian and economic consequences for the Palestinian population were profound. There were already food shortages. Palestinian workers and traders to Israel were unable to cross the border".

On 15 January 2006, the Karni crossing – the sole point for exports of goods from Gaza – was closed completely for all kinds of exports. The greenhouse project suffered a huge blow, as the harvest of high-value crops, meant to be exported for Europe via Israel, was essentially lost (with a small part of the harvest donated to local institutions). Moreover, closing of Karni cut off the so-far resilient textile and furniture industries in Gaza from their source of income. Starting February 2006, the Karni crossing was sporadically open for exports, but the amount of goods allowed to be exported was minuscule compared to the amount of goods imported (which, in turn, barely supported Gaza's needs). Between 1 January and 11 May, more than 12,700 tonnes of produce were harvested in Gaza's greenhouses, almost all of it destined for export; out of it, only 1,600 tonnes (less than 13%) were actually exported.

=== 2007-2008 ===
In March 2007, after winning the 2006 election for the Palestinian Legislative Council, Hamas joined Fatah in a PA unity government headed by Hamas leader Ismail Haniyeh. In June, Hamas seized control of the Strip in the Battle of Gaza, capturing Palestinian Authority government institutions and replacing Fatah and other PA officials with Hamas members.

In response, in the autumn of 2007, Israel designated the Gaza Strip as a "hostile entity" and instituted a series of sanctions, including power reductions, stringent import restrictions, and border closures. Israel said the new restrictions were designed to hold Hamas "responsible and accountable" for rocket attacks on Israeli territory, to constrain its ability to rule in Gaza, and to put pressure on it to release Gilad Shalit, an Israeli soldier then held captive (and released in 2011).

In January 2008, in response to ongoing rocket attacks on its southern communities, Israel expanded its sanctions, fully sealing its border with the Gaza Strip and temporarily halting fuel imports. Later in January, after nearly a week of the heightened Israeli blockade, Hamas militants dismantled sections of the barrier along the Gaza Strip-Egypt border, which was closed from Hamas's takeover in mid-2007 until 2011, creating openings that, allowed an estimated hundreds of thousands of Gazans to cross into Egypt to procure food, fuel, and other goods unattainable due to the blockade. Egyptian president Hosni Mubarak temporarily allowed the border breach to mitigate civilian suffering in Gaza before initiating efforts to reestablish the border.

=== Sanctions on Hamas-led PA governments ===
After the PLC was sworn in on 18 February 2006, Israel imposed more sanctions, including withholding the PA's tax revenue (collected by Israel on the PA's behalf), and travel restrictions on Hamas PLC members. The Israeli government announced it would have no contact with a government that included Hamas, branding it a terrorist organization, a position shared by the US and the EU. On 20 February, Hamas leader Ismail Haniyeh was nominated to form a new PA government, which was sworn in on 29 March.

Besides Israel's position in relation to a Hamas-led PA government, the Quartet on the Middle East said after the election that aid to and dialogue with the PA under a Hamas government required that Hamas agree to three conditions: recognition of Israel, the disavowal of violent actions, and acceptance of previous agreements between Israel and the PA, including the Oslo Accords. Haniyeh refused to accept these conditions, and the Quartet stopped all dialogue with the PA, especially any member of the Hamas government, ceased providing aid to the PA, and imposed sanctions against the PA under Hamas. In April 2006, after initial opposition, the US government agreed to discontinue $400 million of foreign aid to the PA. Instead the US redirected $100 million to the United Nations and other non-Palestinian groups, but no aid money was given directly to the government of Mahmoud Abbas.

As noted by James Wolfensohn (and also in an EU paper), withholding the PA's own tax revenue—an action taken by Israel alone, not by the Quartet—was more damaging than the ceasing of international aid to the PA. These taxes, collected in Palestine (both in the West Bank and Gaza) by Israeli authorities, were supposed to be transferred to the PA's budget. By releasing or withholding these revenues, Israel was able, in the words of the International Crisis Group, to "virtually turn the Palestinian economy on and off". Israel withheld these transfers from the PA until June 2007. Withholding the tax revenue made the PA unable to pay its employees, including the police, further destabilizing Gaza.

== History ==
The Gaza Strip

=== Early 2000s ===
During the Second Intifada, Israel blockaded the Palestinian territories, including the Gaza Strip, several times. In Gaza, the blockade caused unemployment to skyrocket to 85%. Christian Aid reported that malnourishment among children doubled in one year due to the blockade. Clinics run by Middle East Council of Churches also reported treating increasing numbers of underweight and malnourished children.

=== June 2007 – January 2008 ===
In June 2007, Hamas took control of the Gaza Strip in the Battle of Gaza, and removed Fatah officials. Following the Hamas takeover, the sanctions put in place after Hamas's 2006 electoral victory were dramatically tightened. Truck transits, which had been 12,000 per month in 2005, were reduced to 2,000 by November of that year, when in a further measure, in the context of Hamas rocket fire and Israeli attacks, food supplies were halved, fuel imports slashed and foreign currency restricted by the latter.

Following the Hamas takeover in Gaza, Egypt and Israel largely sealed their border crossings with Gaza, on the grounds that Fatah had fled and the PA was no longer providing security on the Palestinian side.

In July 2007, Israeli officials said they had been planning to open the Rafah border crossing to allow stranded Palestinians to return, but claimed that this plan had been cancelled after Hamas threatened to fire on the refugees.

A Jerusalem Post article mentioned Hamas' complaints that since June 2008 the PA no longer granted passports to Gazans, thereby "preventing tens of thousands of Palestinians from being able to travel abroad".

Egypt, fearing a spill-over of Hamas-style militancy into its territory, kept its border with Gaza largely sealed. Israel sealed the border completely on 17 January in response to rocket attacks on southern Israel and Palestinian militant attacks on crossing points between Israel and Gaza.

The Egyptian government feared also that Iran wanted to establish a base in its territory as well as in Gaza through its proxy Hezbollah following the 2009 Hezbollah plot in Egypt.

=== January 2008 breach of the Egypt-Gaza border ===
On 22 January 2008, Gazans clashed with Egyptian police in front of the border, demanding that the Rafah Border Crossing be opened. The clashes included live fire, and there were injuries on both sides. Fifty women managed to cross, and Egyptian police responded with a water cannon assault. Additional Egyptian security forces arrived, and managed to restore calm and prevent further crossing.

The breach of the Gaza–Egypt border began on 23 January 2008, after gunmen in the Gaza Strip set off an explosion near the Rafah Border Crossing, destroying part of the former Israeli Gaza Strip barrier. The United Nations estimated that as many as half of the population of the Gaza Strip crossed the border into Egypt seeking food and supplies. Israel said that militants had exploited the breach in the border wall to send armed men into the Sinai to infiltrate Israel across the Sinai-Israel border. Egyptian troops at first permitted the crossing but did not allow Palestinians to travel further than El Arish. On 25 January, Egyptian forces blocked almost all illegal entry points to stem the flow of Gazans pouring in, and Egyptian riot police erected barbed wire and chain-link fences along the border. Palestinians used a bulldozer to knock down the fence and once again flooded in. Egyptian border police began stopping Palestinians from crossing and sealed the road from Rafah to El Arish. On 28 January, Egyptian security forces and Hamas militants strung barbed wire across one of the breaches, sealing it off. The Egyptians began repairing one of the two remaining breaches on 29 January, and closed the border with the Gaza Strip on 3 February 2008.

=== June 2008 attempt at easing restrictions ===
Under a ceasefire agreement between Israel and Hamas in June 2008, Israel agreed to lift its blockade of Gaza Strip. At Egypt's request, Israel did not always respond to Palestinian ceasefire violations by closing the border.

Israel accused Hamas of transporting weapons into Gaza via tunnels to Egypt, failing to stop rocket attacks, and noted that Hamas would not continue negotiating the release of Israeli hostage Gilad Shalit, who had been held by Hamas since 2006. Hamas' decision alienated it from the government of Egypt, which had linked the opening of the Gaza-Egypt border crossing to Shalit's release. In the early stage of the ceasefire, Israeli officials had said they found "a certain sense of progress" on Shalit's release.

The UN recorded seven Israel Defense Forces (IDF) violations of the ceasefire between 20 and 26 June, and three violations by Palestinian groups not affiliated with Hamas between 23 and 26 June. On 18 December, the Izz ad-Din al-Qassam Brigades, the military wing of Hamas, reported 185 Israeli violations during the lull period. The Intelligence and Terrorism Information Center reported a total of 223 rockets and 139 mortar shells fired from Gaza during the lull, including 20 rockets and 18 mortar shells before 4 November. It noted that "Hamas was careful to maintain the ceasefire" until 4 November, when the ceasefire was "seriously eroded". Rocket fire decreased by 98 percent in the four and a half months between 18 June and 4 November, compared to the four and a half months preceding the ceasefire. Hamas denied responsibility for the rocket fire during the lull. Human Rights Watch reported that Hamas security forces demonstrated an ability to curb rocket fire while some people detained for rocket fire were released without explanation.

In August 2008, the first NGO-organized attempts to breach Israel's maritime closure of the Gaza Strip occurred when two vessels, containing activists from the Free Gaza Movement and International Solidarity Movement, sailed from Cyprus towards Gaza, carrying hearing aids and balloons. The boats reached Gaza on 23 August 2008 after the Israeli government allowed the boats free passage. Four more voyages occurred from October until December 2008, as passengers were transported another boat called the "Dignity", a 66-foot yacht owned by the Free Gaza Movement. The Dignity was rammed three times while it was sailing in international waters by the Israeli Navy and significant damage was incurred.

On 28 October 2008, the Dignity, carrying 26 activists and medical supplies, docked in a strip harbor without interference. Israel had initially decided to stop the vessel, but the decision was made to let it through just before it reached Gaza. The Dignity sailed to Gaza four times before it was attacked on 30 December 2008 in international waters, as it sailed towards Gaza to deliver medicine and medical help.

In August 2008, it was reported that Israel despite the ceasefire was still allowing in very few goods. A WikiLeaks cable from the US embassy in Tel Aviv dated 3 November 2008 revealed that Israel still maintained the economy of the Gaza strip "on the brink of collapse" without "pushing it over the edge". The cable said that "Israeli officials have confirmed to Embassy officials on multiple occasions that they intend to keep the Gazan economy functioning at the lowest level possible consistent with avoiding a humanitarian crisis."

=== 2008–2009 Gaza war and aftermath ===
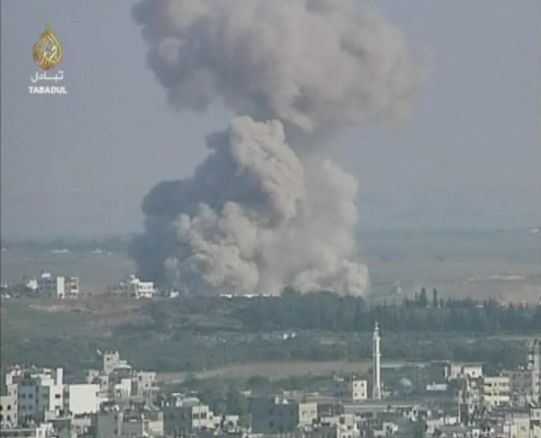
An explosion caused by an Israeli airstrike in Gaza during the Gaza War

In January 2009, after the first phase of the Gaza War, Israel said it would allow in some humanitarian aid, but will continue its economic blockade in order to weaken the power of Hamas. In June 2009, on the second anniversary of the blockade, 38 United Nations and non-governmental humanitarian organisations issued a joint press release calling for "free and uninhibited access for all humanitarian assistance in accordance with the international agreements and in accordance with universally recognised international human rights and humanitarian law standards". As of July 2009, Israel said it is making the humanitarian relief efforts in Gaza one of its top priorities. The amount of goods Israel allows into Gaza is one quarter of the pre- blockade flow.

Israeli prime minister Ehud Olmert's spokesman Mark Regev said, "We want to make sure that reconstruction for the people of Gaza is not reconstruction for the Hamas regime". On 25 February, U.S. State Department spokesman Robert Wood said, "Aid should never be used as a political weapon. We'll try to push to get into Gaza as many supplies as possible."

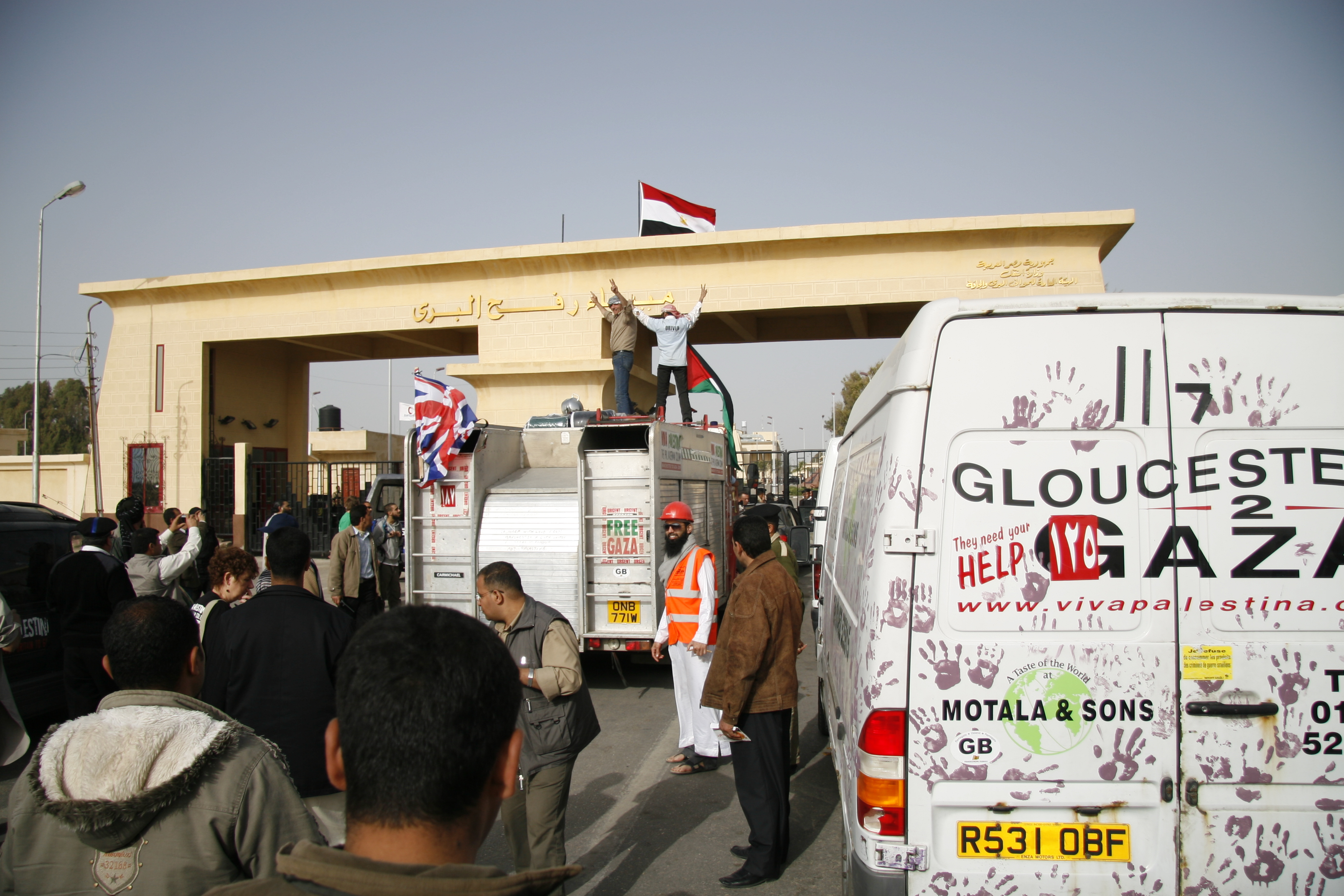
Rafah border crossing – British aid convoy entering Gaza Strip from Egypt in 2009

The Olmert cabinet had decided in March 2009 that food and medical supplies to Gaza would be allowed through unfettered. This was met with resistance by Israel's Defense Ministry, which controls the border crossings. An Israeli military spokesperson said that each item was decided on an individual basis and that food was being let through daily. According to NGO Gisha, the amount of food entering Gaza is as of May 2009, about 25% of the pre-June 2007 figures. A UN study has found that Gazan families are eating fewer meals a day and mainly relying on carbohydrates such as rice and flour because protein foods are expensive or unavailable. Chicken eggs have doubled in price due to the destruction of chicken coops during the Gaza War.

=== February 2009 Hamas-UNRWA incident ===
On 3 February, 3,500 blankets and over 400 food parcels were confiscated by Hamas police personnel from an UNRWA distribution center. On the following day, the UN Emergency Relief Coordinator demanded that the aid be returned immediately. In a separate incident on 5 February, Hamas seized 200 tons of food from UNRWA aid supplies. The following day, UNRWA suspended its activities in Gaza. Hamas issued a statement stating that the incident was a misunderstanding between the drivers of the trucks and had been resolved through direct contact with the UNRWA. On 9 February, UNRWA lifted the suspension on the movement of its humanitarian supplies into Gaza, after the Hamas authorities returned all of the aid supplies confiscated.

=== 2010–2011 freedom flotillas ===
May 2010 Gaza flotilla raid

On 31 May 2010, the Israeli Navy seized an aid convoy of six ships known as the "Gaza Freedom Flotilla". aiming to break through the blockade, carrying humanitarian aid and construction materials. The flotilla had declined an Israeli request to change course to the port of Ashdod, where the Israeli government had said it would inspect the aid and deliver (or let humanitarian organizations deliver) Israeli-approved items to Gaza.

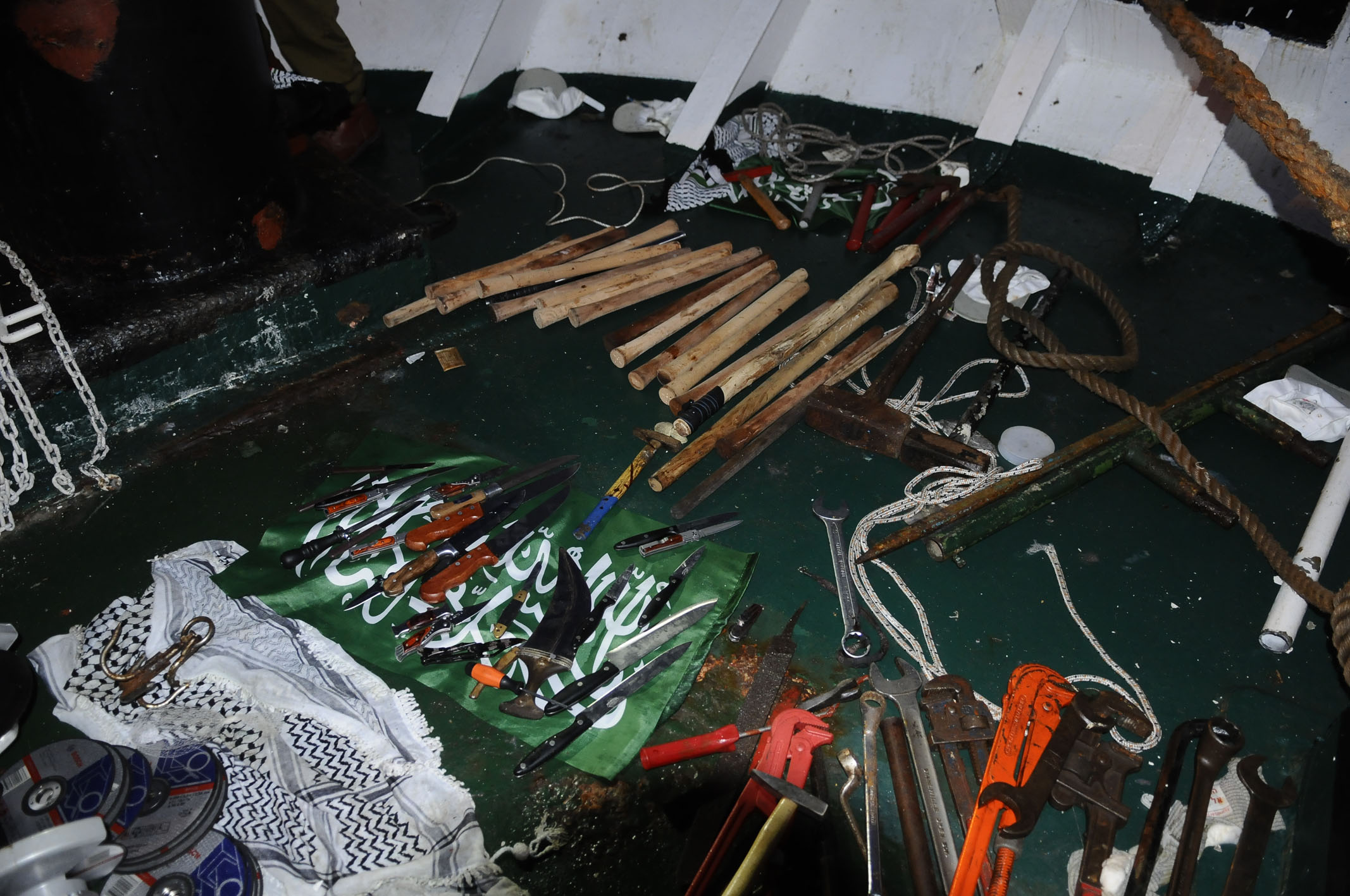
Image provided by the IDF of weaponry it says was used by passengers aboard the MV Mavi Marmara. Israeli soldiers raided the Gaza Freedom Flotilla in international waters in 2010. Nine of the flotilla passengers were killed and 30 were wounded; some Israeli soldiers were wounded.

Israeli Shayetet 13 naval commandos boarded the ships from speedboats and helicopters launched from three missile ships, while the flotilla was still in international waters. On the MV Mavi Marmara, the main ship of the convoy, passengers attacked and managed to capture three soldiers. Israeli soldiers responded with rubber bullets and live ammunition from soldiers in helicopters and on the ship. Several of the activists were shot in the head by Israeli forces, some from behind and at close range. Israel was accused of using disproportionate force. On other ships, soldiers were met with passive resistance which was easily suppressed with non-lethal techniques. Nine passengers were killed and dozens wounded. Nine soldiers were also injured, two of them seriously. All of the ships were seized and towed to Ashdod, while passengers were imprisoned in Israel and then deported to their home countries. The MV Rachel Corrie, a seventh ship that had been delayed, set sail from Malta on the same day of the flotilla's interception. Israeli naval vessels shadowed the Rachel Corrie, and after it ignored three warnings, Israeli commandos boarded the ship from speedboats, arrested the crew, and forced it to sail to Ashdod.

Freedom Flotilla II

Following the Gaza flotilla raid, a coalition of 22 NGOs assembled in July 2011 a flotilla of 10 vessels and 1,000 activists to breach the blockade.

The vessels docked in Greece in preparation for the journey to Gaza, but the Greek government announced that it would not allow the vessels to leave for Gaza, and the Hellenic Coast Guard stopped three vessels attempting to evade the travel ban and leave port. On 7 July, most activists left for home, leaving only a few dozen to continue the initiative. On 16 July, the French yacht Dignite Al Karama was allowed to leave port after informing Greek authorities that its destination was Alexandria, Egypt. The yacht then headed directly for Gaza. The Israeli Navy stopped the Dignite Al Karama about 65 kilometers off Gaza. After the boat was warned and refused to turn back, it was surrounded by three Israeli naval vessels and boarded by Shayetet 13 commandos, who took it over. The boat was then taken to Ashdod. Ultimately, the Freedom Flotilla sailing did not take place.

November 2011 flotilla

On 4 November 2011, the Israeli Navy intercepted two vessels heading towards Gaza in a private initiative to break the blockade. Shayetet 13 commandos boarded the vessels from speedboats and took them over with no resistance. The vessels were then taken to Ashdod port.

=== June 2010 easing of the blockade ===
Facing mounting international calls to ease or lift their blockade in response to the 2010 Gaza flotilla raid, Egypt and Israel lessened the restrictions starting in June 2010. Israel announced that it will allow all strictly civilian goods into Gaza while preventing weapons and what it designates as "dual-use" items from entering Gaza. Egypt partly opened the Rafah border crossing from Egypt to Gaza, primarily for people, but not for supplies, to go through. The Israeli NGO Gisha Legal Center for Freedom of Movement reported in a July 2010 publication that Israel continues to prevent normal functioning of the Gazan economy. Israel continues to severely restrict and/or prevent people from entering or exiting Gaza according to Gisha. The United Nations Office for the Coordination of Humanitarian Affairs (UNOCHA) conducted an assessment of the humanitarian impact of the easing of the blockage in January and February 2011 and concluded that they did not result in a significant improvement in people's livelihoods. The World Bank estimated in 2015 that the GDP losses caused by the blockade since 2007 was above 50%, and entailed large welfare losses.

On 1 June 2010, the Rafah border crossing from Egypt to Gaza was partially opened. Egypt's foreign ministry has made it clear that the crossing will remain open mainly for people, not for aid, to go through. Several aid trucks began making it into Gaza during the following morning including some carrying power generators from the Egyptian Red Crescent, and hundreds of Gazans who had been staying in Egypt returned home, although little traffic, human or cargo, flowed from Gaza to Egypt. On 3 June, the manager of the Gaza side of the Rafah crossing, Salameh Barakeh, explained that the crossing is open for the free travel of patients, foreign passport holders, those with residency status in other countries, students and internationals. The Arab Physicians Union officials submitted a request to Egyptian authorities on 3 June 2010 to send 400 tons of food, blankets, electric generators for hospitals and construction material from Egypt to Gaza, but their request was denied by Egyptian authorities without specific reason. Emad Gad, political analyst at Egyptian Al-Ahram Center for Political and Strategic Studies, believes the government should keep the Rafah border under control because opening it completely could allow weapons smuggling or illegal financial transactions.

On 17 June 2010, Israel's Prime Minister's Office announced that Israel's security cabinet had agreed to relax Israel's blockade on the Gaza Strip, and issued an English-language press release, according to which a decision to ease the blockade had been made. The English text reads: "It was agreed to liberalize the system by which civilian goods enter Gaza [and] expand the inflow of materials for civilian projects that are under international supervision." However, no binding decision has been made during the cabinet meeting, and an announcement issued in Hebrew did not mention any such decision. The prime minister's office said that a meeting would be held soon, and expressed hope that a binding decision will be taken then.

==== International response to easing of restrictions ====
Tony Blair, who welcomed Israel's decision to ease the restrictions on behalf of the Quartet on the Middle East, said that the Quartet – the UN, US, EU, and Russia – would continue talks with Israel "to flesh out the principles". Suggesting that "items of ordinary daily life, including materials for the construction of homes, infrastructure and services as the UN have asked" should be allowed to enter Gaza, he said, "the decision to allow foodstuffs and household items is a good start". A spokesperson for the Secretary-General of the United Nations declared that the Secretary-General would be encouraged that the Israeli government is reviewing its policy towards Gaza. He added that the United Nations would continue to seek a fundamental change in policy as agreed by the Quartet. Hamas spokesperson Sami Abu Zuhri said that Israel's decision would have been designed to "beautify" the blockade and mislead public opinion.

A British Foreign Office spokesman said: "It is good that Israel is giving serious consideration to resolving these issues, [b]ut further work is needed. We need to see the additional steps still to be announced." EU officials also said they were disappointed by the decision. German Minister of Economic Cooperation and Development Dirk Niebel said that the Israeli announcement was "not sufficient". During a visit to the country, Niebel intended to visit a sewage treatment plant being financed with German development aid, but was denied entry into the Gaza strip by Israel. He commented that the Israeli government sometimes would "not make it easy for its friends to explain why it behaves the way it does." A spokesperson for Israel's Foreign Ministry responded that Israel would have been obliged to allow any other European minister entry if it had allowed Niebel to visit the Gaza strip, thus conferring additional legitimacy to the Hamas government.

Chris Gunness from UNRWA criticised Israel's move to ease the blockade as not being adequate, saying that

Even if the blockade is eased it remains illegal under international law as it is a collective form of punishment on a civilian population. Eighty percent of Gaza's population is aid-dependent. Allowing more aid in is perpetuating this dependency and not addressing the issue of self-sufficiency or the root causes of the crisis. What have not been addressed by the easing of the closure are the issues of exports as well as the limited number of crossings open to facilitate the flow of goods. Operation Cast Lead destroyed at least 60,000 homes and structures which need to be urgently repaired and rebuilt. The easing of the blockade is not addressing this adequately.

Maxwell Gaylard, UN Deputy Special and Humanitarian Coordinator for the Middle East also criticised Israel, saying "Permitting mayonnaise and potato chips into Gaza is really irrelevant in dealing with the underlying issues. What we need to see is an improvement in Gaza's water, sanitation, power grid, educational and health sectors. Gaza's economy is shot to pieces and its infrastructure is extremely fragile."

==== New blockade policy by Israel ====
On 20 June 2010, Israel's Security Cabinet approved a new system governing the blockade that would allow practically all non-military or dual-use items to enter the Gaza strip. According to a cabinet statement, Israel would "expand the transfer of construction materials designated for projects that have been approved by the Palestinian Authority, including schools, health institutions, water, sanitation and more – as well as (projects) that are under international supervision." Despite the easing of the land blockade, Israel will continue to inspect all goods bound for Gaza by sea at the port of Ashdod.

Israeli Prime Minister Benjamin Netanyahu said that the decision enabled Israel to focus on real security issues and would eliminate "Hamas' main propaganda claim," and that it would strengthen the case for keeping the sea blockade in place. He also said the decision would have been coordinated with the United States and with Tony Blair, the representative of the Quartet for the Middle East. Blair characterized the decision as a "very significant step forward", but added that the decision needs to be implemented. In a statement, the Quartet said that the situation remained "unsustainable and unacceptable" and maintained that a long-term solution was urgently needed. The UNRWA called for a complete lift of the Gaza blockade, expressing concern that the new policy would continue to limit Gaza's ability to develop on its own. The European Union's representative for foreign policy, Catherine Ashton, welcomed the decision. She called the step "a significant improvement" and expressed the expectation that the measures take effect as soon as possible, adding that "more work remains to be done." The U.S. government welcomed the decision, expressing the belief that the easing would significantly improve the lives of Gaza Strip residents and prevent weapons smuggling. It expressed its intention to contribute to an international effort to "explore additional ways to improve the situation in Gaza, including greater freedom of movement and commerce between Gaza and the West Bank." Hamas dismissed the measures as trivial and "media propaganda", and demanded a complete lifting of the blockade, including the removal on all restrictions on the import of construction material. Israeli Arab member of Knesset Hanin Zoabi commented that the easing of the blockade would prove that "it is not a security blockade, but a political one," adding that the flotilla "succeeded in undermining the blockade's legitimacy."

The U.S., United Nations, European Union and Russia in 2010 were jointly consulting with Israel, the Palestinian Authority and Egypt on additional measures, described by the United States Department of State as a "fundamental change in policy" toward the Gaza strip.

==== Lieberman Proposal ====
On 2 June 2010 a letter in the London newspaper The Times suggested the establishment of a permanent humanitarian sea corridor linking Cyprus with Gaza. In July 2010, a similar proposal emerged from Israel's foreign minister Avigdor Lieberman who proposed it as part of an initiative to shift full responsibility over the Gaza Strip to the international community. He announced that he planned to discuss the idea, which was labelled a "personal initiative" with the EU foreign policy chief Catherine Ashton.

Lieberman proposed that units of the French Foreign Legion and commando units from EU member states be sent in to secure the Gaza border crossings to prevent the smuggling of weapons, and that the border with Israel be sealed. Ships that underwent inspections in Cyprus or Greece would be allowed to dock in Gaza and unload humanitarian cargoes. The EU would help improve and build civilian infrastructure, and Gaza would become a fully independent entity.

Lieberman, then defense minister, proposed a similar maritime corridor plan to Cyprus in 2018, at a time when a number of such options were being considered in Israel.

==== Humanitarian impact assessment ====
In January and February 2011, the United Nations Office for the Coordination of Humanitarian Affairs (UNOCHA) conducted an assessment of the effects of the measures to ease the access restrictions. They concluded that they did not result in a significant improvement in people's livelihoods.

They found that a limited reactivation of the private sector resulted from the increased availability of consumer goods and some raw materials but the "pivotal nature of the remaining restrictions" and the effects of three years of strict blockade prevented a significant improvement in livelihoods. Although the unemployment rate in Gaza fell from 39.3% to 37.4% in the second half of 2010 there were significant food price rises. There was little or no improvement in food insecurity rates in Gaza which continued to affect 52% of the population. Few of the 40,000 housing units needed to replace homes lost during Operation Cast Lead and for natural population growth could be built as a result of the ongoing restrictions on importing building materials. The approval of over 100 projects funded by international organizations intended to improve the "extremely deteriorated" water and sanitation, education and health services, followed the easing of the blockade. The implementation of these projects was delayed by the entry approval process for materials and the limited opening of the Karni crossing. OCHA found that there had been no improvement in the quality of services provided to the population of the Gaza Strip as a result of the projects so far. There was no significant increase in the number of exit permits granted by Israel to allow access to the outside world including other parts of the Palestinian territories. Permits continued to be issued by Israel only on an exceptional basis with 106–114 per day being issued during the second half of 2010. OCHA described Egypt's move to regularly operate its crossing with Gaza for special categories of people as a "significant, albeit limited, improvement".

They concluded that the easing of restrictions was "a step in the right direction" but called on Israel to fully abolish the blockade including removing restrictions on the import of construction materials and the exports of goods, and to lift the general ban on the movement of people between Gaza and the West Bank via Israel in order to comply with what they described as international humanitarian and human rights law obligations.

According to the World Health Organization, the shortage of essential medicines and equipment has been the primary obstacle to providing adequate health care in the Gaza Strip since the 2012 conflict. Gazan hospitals had a shortage of more than 50% of "medical consumables" even before the conflict. Workers in some hospitals reported having to sterilize and re-use single-use equipment due to the lack of critical items. Palestinian hospitals are unable to meet the need of their patients due to economic underdevelopment and the varying strictness of the Israeli blockade. According to B'Tselem, Restrictions on Movement the blockade, which not only restricts Gazans' access to Israel but also communication between Gaza and the West Bank, has denied Gazan fishermen access to 85% of the waters they have been guaranteed access to.

During the 2014 Israel–Gaza Conflict, 108,000 people were displaced, almost all of whom are still living in UNWRA refugee camps or inadequate improvised shelters. 28 schools, numerous wells, and other important civil infrastructure like major sewage and electricity plants were destroyed during Operation Protective Edge. Since then over 2,000 truckloads of materials for reconstruction have been allowed into Gaza, but according to a UN estimate, 735 truckloads per day, for three years, would be necessary to rebuild all the damaged infrastructure.

=== Further easing (2011–2013) ===
Following the Egyptian Revolution of 2011, Egypt for some time opened the Rafah border crossing permanently as of 28 May 2011. A limited number of women of all ages and men aged below 18 and above 40 were able to enter Egypt without a visa, although there are still severe restrictions on the movement of personnel and goods to and from Gaza. In 2012 Egypt started supplying fuel to the Gaza Strip, to help ease a lengthy fuel crisis arising from a dispute between Egypt and the Hamas government in Gaza over whether Gaza can trade with Egypt openly, or only via Israel.

In 2013 Israel eased its regulation on the entering of construction material into Gaza. The regulation was an attempt to reduce rocket fire in the south.

Prior to a Gaza visit, scheduled for April 2013, Turkey's prime minister Recep Tayyip Erdogan explained to Turkish newspaper Hürriyet that the fulfilment of three conditions by Israel was necessary for friendly relations to resume between Turkey and Israel: an apology for the raid (Prime Minister Netanyahu had delivered an apology to Erdogan by telephone on 22 March 2013), the awarding of compensation to the families affected by the raid, and the lifting of the Gaza blockade by Israel. The Turkish prime minister also explained in the Hürriyet interview, in relation to the April 2013 Gaza visit, "We will monitor the situation to see if the promises are kept or not." At the same time, Netanyahu affirmed that Israel would only consider exploring the removal of the Gaza blockade if peace ("quiet") is achieved in the area.

=== Gaza war ===
On 9 October 2023, Israel intensified its blockade of the Gaza Strip when it announced a total blockade, blocking the entry of food, water, medicine, fuel and electricity after the October 7 attacks and the ensuing Gaza war. The blockade has been credited with contributing significantly to what critics call "the Gaza genocide." Israel has conditioned its lifting of the blockade with the return of the hostages abducted by Hamas, which has been criticized as collective punishment and an apparent war crime. As of August 2025, 27 European countries and over 100 international aid organizations have called for an end to Israel's blockade of aid into Gaza.

A few weeks after 9 October 2023, Israel eased the complete blockade after receiving pressure from U.S. President Joe Biden, but still continued to severely restrict the amount of aid entering the Gaza Strip. The first supplies entered on 21 October 2023. The blockade exacerbated Gaza's humanitarian crisis. In January 2024, Israeli authorities blocked 56% of humanitarian aid to northern Gaza. On 9 February 2024, UNRWA's director Philippe Lazzarini said that Israel had blocked food for 1.1 million Palestinians in Gaza.

During the January 2025 Gaza war ceasefire, Israel relaxed aid restrictions, allowing much more aid than previously. On 2 March 2025, however, Israel completely blocked all supplies from entering the territory, making it the longest complete closure in the history of the blockade. Since 26 May 2025, the United States- and Israeli-backed Gaza Humanitarian Foundation has facilitated limited and largely ineffective aid distribution, marred by mass killings that resulted in over 1,400 Palestinian deaths.

The blockade has created famine conditions in the Gaza Strip, which was exacerbated by Israeli airstrikes targeting food infrastructure and restrictions on humanitarian aid. In a number of incidents, Israeli protesters, including West Bank settlers, blocked aid trucks carrying humanitarian aid heading towards the Gaza Strip, and in some cases attacked them.

==== Famine ====
The population of the Gaza Strip underwent a famine as a result of an Israeli blockade during the Gaza war between 22 August 2025 and 19 December 2025. The prevention of basic essentials and humanitarian aid from entering Gaza, as well as airstrikes that destroyed food infrastructure, such as bakeries, mills, and food stores, caused a widespread scarcity of essential supplies. (Note: According to B'Tselem, the famine risk is a direct outcome of Israeli policy: "This reality is not a byproduct of war, but a direct result of Israel's declared policy. Residents now depend entirely on food supplies from outside Gaza, as they can no longer produce almost any food themselves. Most cultivated fields have been destroyed, and accessing open areas during the war is dangerous in any case. Bakeries, factories and food warehouses have been bombed or shut down due to lack of basic supplies, fuel and electricity.") Humanitarian aid was also blocked by protests at borders and ports. Increasing societal breakdown in Gaza, including looting, was also cited as a barrier to the provision of aid.

By August 2025, Integrated Food Security Phase Classification (IPC) projections showed that 100% of the population are experiencing "high levels of acute food insecurity", and 32% were projected to face Phase 5 catastrophic levels by 30 September 2025. On 22 August 2025, the IPC said that famine is taking place in at least one of the five governorates in the Gaza Strip: specifically, the Gaza Governorate which includes Gaza City. The IPC added that, within the next month, famine was likely to also occur in both the Deir al-Balah Governorate and the Khan Yunis Governorate. The IPC had insufficient data on the North Gaza Governorate for a classification but concluded that conditions were likely similar or worse than in the Gaza Governorate. Within the next 6 weeks as of 16 August, the number of people in IPC Phase 5 was expected to rise from 500,000 to over 640,000.

On 22 October 2025, the International Court of Justice found that Israel is obliged to guarantee sufficient food to Gazans and to allow UNRWA to operate in Gaza. On 19 December, the IPC published a report declaring that there is no longer a famine in Gaza after improvements in food delivery following the ceasefire, but warned that the situation remains "highly fragile" with 100,000 still facing "catastrophic conditions", although that number was projected to decline to 1,900 by April 2026. As of January 2026, Gazans have received enough humanitarian aid to meet their basic food needs for the first time since the start of the war.

However, in late July 2026, the IPC reported that the scale-up of humanitarian assistance, enabled by the October 2025 ceasefire, has driven improvements in food security and nutrition conditions across Gaza, but that over 1.2 million people (59% of the population of Gaza) continued to face Phase 3 Crisis levels of food insecurity or worse, including 212,000 (about 10% of Gazans) experiencing Phase 4 Emergency levels, and warned that Gaza is still experiencing a severe food emergency that could develop into another famine.

== Border crossings ==
At the end of 2023, there were two open border crossings with Israel (Kerem Shalom border crossing and Erez), with an additional option via an Israel-Egypt crossing (Nitzana), and two border crossings with Egypt (Rafah Crossing and Salah al-Din Gate 4 km northwest of Rafah Crossing). On 12 March 2024, as a "pilot project", the 96th gate in the security fence (near Kibbutz Be'eri) was used by a convoy of six trucks taking humanitarian aid to northern Gaza under IDF protection.

== Military impact ==
The Israeli government justifies the blockade as a security measure. According to Sara Roy, Israeli security officials have said the blockade has limited value against extremist attacks. Ghazi Hamad, a senior Hamas member, said in 2024 that the blockade made importing components for Hamas weapons industry a challenge. Machine tools and explosives were either labeled for civilian use or hidden inside shipments of food or other goods. Jerome Slater described the blockade as a form of continuing Israeli control over the Strip, adding that "most Palestinian terrorism almost certainly would have ended" if Israel had ceased to occupy the West Bank and Gaza, and considered it probable that the policy of deliberate impoverization creates as much terrorism as it deters.

== Socioeconomic impact ==
The worsening economic and humanitarian situation raised great concern abroad. According to the UN Conference on Trade and Development (UNCTAD), in January 2003, the Israeli blockade and closures had drained as much as US$2.4 billion out of the economy of the West Bank and the Gaza Strip.

Throughout 2006, the Karni crossing was only partially operational, costing Palestinians $500,000 a day, as less than 10% of the Gaza Strip's minimal daily export targets were achieved. Basic food commodities were severely depleted, bakeries closed and food rationing was introduced.

The World Bank estimated in 2015 that the GDP losses caused by the blockade since 2007 was above 50%, and entailed large welfare losses. Gaza's manufacturing sector, once significant, shrunk by as much as 60% in real terms, due to the wars in the past 20 years and the blockade. Gaza's exports virtually disappeared since the imposition of the 2007 blockade. The World Bank said that "solutions have to be found to enable faster inflow of construction materials into Gaza" while taking into account "legitimate security concerns of neighboring countries."

In May 2015, the World Bank reported that the Gaza economy was on the "verge of collapse". 40% of Gaza's population lived in poverty, even though around 80% received some sort of aid. It said the restrictions had to be eased to allow construction materials "to enter in sufficient quantities" and to allow exports. "The economy cannot survive without being connected to the outside world", The World Bank said the tightened restrictions meant the construction sector's output was reduced by 83%.

=== Role in turning Gaza into an "open-air prison" ===
Several rights groups have characterized the situation in Gaza as an "open-air prison", including the United Nations, Human Rights Watch, and the Norwegian Refugee Council. This characterization was often cited by a number of human rights activists, politicians, and media news outlets reporting on the Gaza-Israel conflict and the wider Palestinian–Israeli conflict. Former British prime minister David Cameron, US senator Bernie Sanders, former Israeli diplomat Gideon Levy, and Israeli historian Ilan Pappe have endorsed this characterization as well.

In 2022, Human Rights Watch issued a report on the situation in the Gaza Strip, which it called an "open-air prison" due to the blockade and held Israel responsible as the occupying power, and to a lesser degree Egypt, which has restricted movement of Palestinians through its border. The report highlighted how this blockade has led to humanitarian crises, namely shortages of essential supplies, limited access to healthcare, and high levels of poverty and unemployment among the Palestinian population in Gaza. It claimed that Israel has formed a formal policy of separation between Gaza and the West Bank, despite both forming parts of the Palestinian territories. The Israeli blockade on Gaza has restricted the freedom of movement of Gaza Palestinians to both the West Bank and the outside world; in particular, Palestinian professionals were most impacted by these restrictions, as applying for travel permit takes several weeks.

The Norwegian Refugee Council report issued in 2018 called the territory "the world's largest open-air prison", highlighting in it several figures, including lack of access to clean water, to reliable electrical supply, to health care, food and employment opportunities. It lamented the fact that a majority of Palestinian children in Gaza suffer from psychological trauma, and a portion of which suffer from stunted growth.

=== Economic effects ===
Following the implementation of the blockade, Israel halted all exports from the Gaza Strip. Israeli human rights organization Gisha, the Legal Center for Freedom of Movement, obtained an Israeli government document which says "A country has the right to decide that it chooses not to engage in economic relations or to give economic assistance to the other party to the conflict, or that it wishes to operate using 'economic warfare'". Sari Bashi, the director of Gisha, said that this showed that Israel was not imposing its blockade for its stated reasons of a security measure to prevent weapons from entering Gaza, but rather as collective punishment for the Palestinian population of Gaza.

In November 2010, the Israeli government allowed Gaza to resume agricultural exports, while still banning industrial exports. Shortly afterward, Gazan farmers began exporting strawberries, peppers, carnations, and cherry tomatoes. The exports travel to Europe via Israel, and Israel then transfers the money to agricultural cooperatives, which in turn pay the Palestinian farmers. The exports were implemented with aid from the Netherlands, which was monitored by the Israeli defense establishment.

It is estimated that in November, less than 20,000 liters of fuel per week entered Gaza via the tunnels, compared to nearly 1 million liters per day until June 2013. The Gaza Power Plant (GPP), which had been supplying 30 percent of the electricity available in Gaza, has been exclusively dependent on Egyptian diesel smuggled through the tunnels, since early 2011. On 1 November, after depleting its fuel reserves, the GPP was forced to shut down, triggering power outages of up to 16 hours per day, up from 8–12 hours prior to that.

The World Bank estimated in 2015 that the GDP losses caused by the blockade since 2007 was above 50%, and entailed large welfare losses. Gaza's manufacturing sector, once significant, shrunk by as much as 60 percent in real terms, due to the wars in the past 20 years and the blockade. Gaza's exports virtually disappeared since the imposition of the 2007 blockade. The World Bank said that "solutions have to be found to enable faster inflow of construction materials into Gaza" while taking into account "legitimate security concerns of neighboring countries."

=== Movement of people ===
Because of the widespread violence within Israel during the Second Intifada that began in September 2000, Israel closed all entry points between Israel and the Palestinian territories, including the Gaza Strip, and closed the Gaza International Airport. On 9 October 2001, all movement of people and goods between Israel and the Palestinian territories was halted, and a complete internal closure came into effect on 14 November 2001.

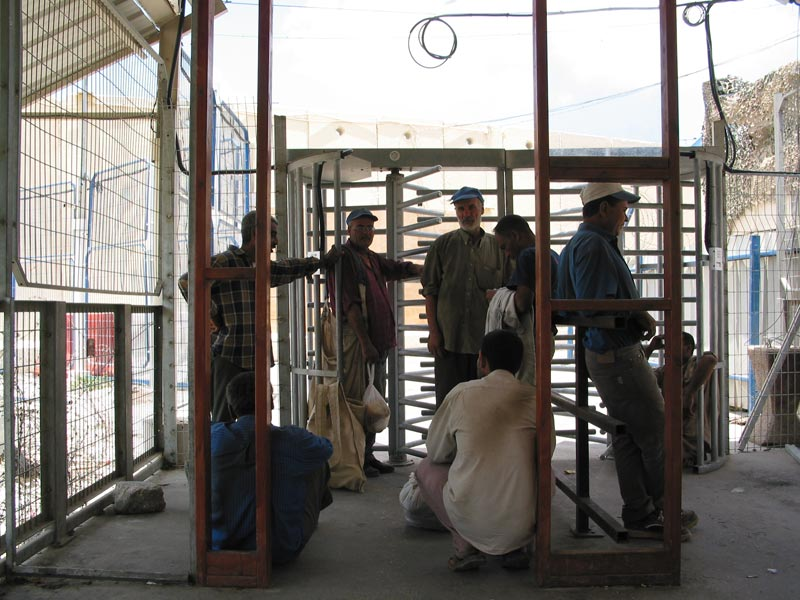
Palestinian workers wait at the Erez Crossing to enter the Gaza Strip, July 2005.

The Intifada came to an end in February 2005, and Israel forces and settlers left the Gaza Strip by 1 September 2005 as part of Israel's unilateral disengagement plan. To improve the movement of people and economic activity in the Gaza Strip, Israel and the PA on 15 November 2005 signed an "Agreement on Movement and Access" (AMA). The AMA provided for the reopening of the Rafah crossing with Egypt, which was to be monitored by the PA and the European Union. Only people with Palestinian identity cards or foreign nationals, subject to Israeli oversight, were to be permitted to cross. In mid-November 2005, Israel started allowing some workers and traders to enter Israel via the Erez crossing, if they had Israeli-issued permits, but until 21 January 2006, the crossing was open on less than 50% of working days on average.

Palestinians were invariably banned from traveling between Gaza and the West Bank. Following the Israeli disengagement from Gaza in September 2005, Israel "[established] a domestic legal framework apparently aimed at sealing off Gaza from Israel and from the West Bank" Israel had previously agreed, as part of the Oslo Accords, to treat Gaza and the West Bank as a single territorial unit, a position upheld by the Israeli High Court. But after the 2005 disengagement, Israel adopted the position that Gaza residents have "no vested right" to cross into the West Bank; and that although there is "a certain connection" between the Gaza Strip and the West Bank, it "does not give Gaza residents a right to enter [the West Bank]". Gaza residents who did not try to cross the territory of Israel proper but instead traveled around it, using the "long and expensive" route via Egypt and Jordan to travel from Gaza to the West Bank, were still turned back by Israeli border personnel at the Allenby Bridge when attempting to enter the West Bank from Jordan. This policy was still in place as of 2014: Gaza residents, except in rare "humanitarian" cases, are not allowed to enter the West Bank – even if they do not travel via Israel proper but around it, trying to enter via the Allenby Bridge.

AMA stipulated the opening hours of crossings between Gaza and Israel and the number of trucks/truckloads to pass through them. It also stipulated that bus convoys, carrying Palestinians from Gaza to the West Bank and vice versa, would start on 15 December 2005; and truck convoys, carrying goods on the same route, would start on 15 January 2006. This agreement was not upheld, as neither bus nor truck convoys started by their respective dates. Israel first announced that according to its interpretation, Israel was only obliged to run a "test" or "pilot" bus route and only for Palestinians meeting certain Israeli-specified requirements, then delayed this pilot project "indefinitely". The part of the agreement concerning opening hours and throughput of border crossings was not implemented either.

The Palestinians claim that Israel did not honor AMA in relation to movement of people between Gaza and the West Bank. The bus convoys between Gaza and the West Bank (which were to start on 15 December 2005) never started.

Gazans are invariably banned from entering the West Bank, and Israel adopted the position that they have no legal right to do so. This position has not changed since 2005.

=== Land blockade ===
The Muslim Brotherhood in the Egyptian parliament wished to open trade across the border with Gaza in 2012, a move said to be resisted by Egypt's Tantawi government.

==== Goods blocked ====
In the "Failing Gaza" report, Amnesty International and other organizations wrote that cement, glass, steel, bitumen, wood, paint, doors, plastic pipes, metal pipes, metal reinforcement rods, aggregate, generators, high voltage cables and wooden telegraph poles were "high priority reconstruction materials currently with no or highly limited entry into Gaza through official crossings." A 2009 UN report by Kevin M. Cahill called the restrictions "Draconian", and said that reconstruction efforts were being undermined by Israel's refusal to permit the importation of steel, cement or glass, among other building materials, and its policy of restricted importation of lentils, pasta, tomato paste and juice, as well as batteries for hearing aids for deaf children. He said that despite the restrictions, UNRWA had been able to provide a basic food supply to over a million refugees in the Gaza Strip. He added that he "visited a food station where hundreds of displaced persons waited to collect their meager staples of rice, sugar, lentils and cooking oil. While this program may save people from starvation, it is a diet that does not prevent the highest level of anemia in the region, with alarming rates of childhood stunting due to inadequate nutrition."

The Palestinians who negotiated the 2008 cease-fire believed that commerce in Gaza was to be restored to the levels preceding Israel's 2005 withdrawal and Hamas's electoral victory. Israeli policy tied the easing of the blockade to success in reducing rocket fire. Israel permitted a 20% increase in goods trucked into Gaza in the pre-lull period, up from 70 to 90 truckloads a day, including not only humanitarian supplies but also clothes, shoes, refrigerators, and construction materials. Fuel supplies increased from 55 MW worth to 65 MW worth. BBC News reported on 11 November that Gaza was then receiving only 28% of the amount of goods traded before the Hamas takeover.

Over the one-month period from 4 November to 8 December, approximately 700 truck loads of goods went into Gaza, accounting for approximately 1/40th of estimated pre-blockade commerce.

Israel said that food imports into the Strip were limited by its inability to operate at border checkpoints. It accused Hamas of exacerbating fuel shortages by leading labor union strikes by power plant workers. It has also accused Hamas of underfunding the Gaza health care system, and then blaming the situation on Israel despite supposed free trade of medical supplies. Shipments of permitted medical supplies have expired due to the lengthy process required for passage through border crossings, requiring their destruction. Israel said that travel restrictions on Gazans are necessary to protect national security, citing the cases of three Gazans who claimed to require medical attention in Israel but were in fact planning attacks in Israel.

==== Tunnels ====
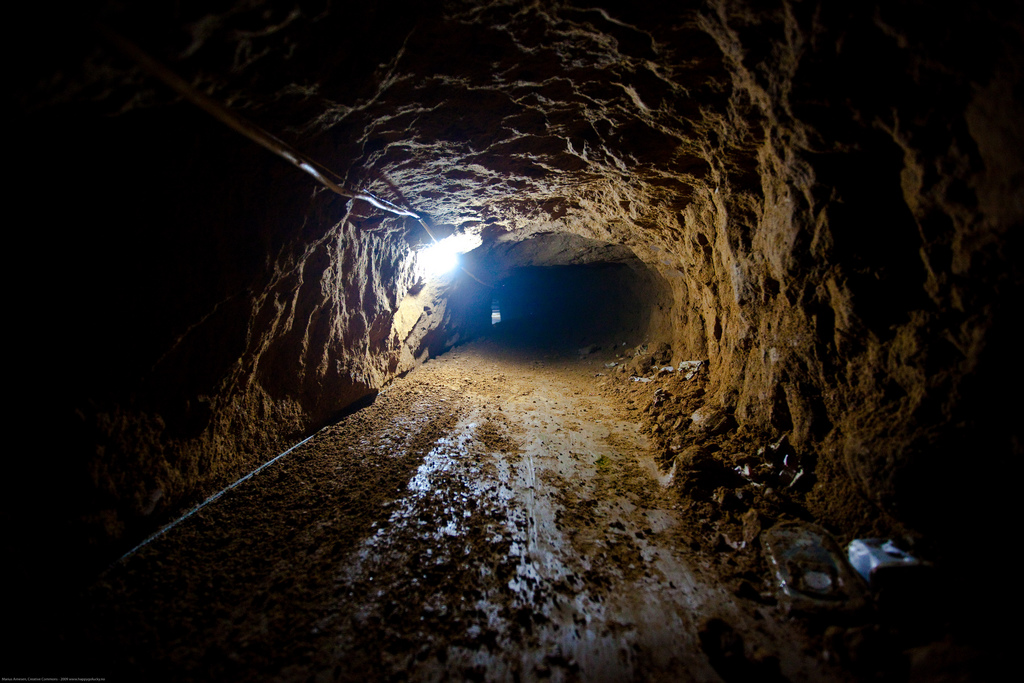
Smuggling tunnel in Rafah, 2009

The Gaza smuggling tunnels are mainly located at Rafah, on the border with Egypt. The tunnels connect the Egyptian town of Rafah with the Palestinian refugee camp of Rafah. As a result of the blockade, these tunnels became a vital supply artery for Gaza. They are used for various purposes, such to transport people (in and out) and commercial materials like medicine, food and clothes, cigarettes, alcohol, and vehicle parts into Gaza. They are also used to smuggle illegal arms (including rockets, mortars and explosives) to Gaza militants. Often cars are sliced into four parts and transported across and re-assembled in Gaza. Ahead of the Islamic festival, Eid al-Adha, they were used to transport live cattle.

According to a tunnel operator, Israel bombards tunnels from the air, while Egypt either pumps poisonous gases and water or detonates explosives to destroy tunnels. During the Gaza War, Israel destroyed most of the tunnels, reducing their number to 150 (from 3,000) as of late 2009. Egypt is constructing an underground steel barrier to prevent circumvention of the blockade through tunnels.

The UN estimates unemployment has risen from 32.5% in September, to around 40%. In addition to people directly employed by tunnels, the shortage of materials has stopped the majority of construction projects in Gaza and left many jobless.

Following the removal of Egyptian president Mohamed Morsi from office, Egypt's military had destroyed most of the 1,200 tunnels used for smuggling food, weapons and other goods into Gaza. After protest sit-ins in Egypt supporting Morsi were dispersed, the border crossing was closed 'indefinitely'.

===== Buffer zone =====
In October 2014, days after an attack in which 33 Egyptian soldiers were killed, Egypt announced it may create a buffer zone between Palestinian Rafah and Egyptian Rafah, where most tunnels were believed to be. Initially, the width of the buffer zone was 500 meter but on 18 November 2014, Egypt said it would expand it to 1 km. On 29 December 2014, the buffer zone was extended again to 5 km.

Egyptian authorities began implementing phase two in the flattening of large swaths of Egyptian Rafah where over 2,000 families lived, and widened the buffer zone. According to Egyptian reports, the second phase involved destroying everything standing across an additional 500 meters from the border area, on top of the 500 meters already cleared several months earlier.

==== Effects of land blockade on Gaza ====
There have been several reports and studies analysing the effect of the blockade on Gaza.

In July 2008, an UNRWA report on the situation in Gaza stated that "the number of households in Gaza below the consumption poverty line continued to grow, reaching 51.8% in 2007 (from 50.7% in 2006)". In the same year, a Palestinian Bureau of Statistics study concluded that 80% of families in Gaza were living below the poverty line. A World Health Organization assessment conducted in 2009 claimed that the level of anemia in babies (9–12 months) was as high as 65%, while a Socio-economic and Food Security Survey Report stated that 61% of Gazans are food insecure and reliant on humanitarian aid. Of those that are food insecure, 65% are children under 18 years. Lastly, a European Network of Implementing Development Agencies (EUNIDA) report notes that, because of the security buffer zone imposed around Gaza as part of the blockade, as of June 2009, 46% of agricultural land was either inaccessible or out of production.

On 14 June 2010, the International Committee of the Red Cross noted that the increasing scarcity of items has led to rises in cost of goods while quality has fallen. There is also "an acute electricity crisis", where electricity supplies are "interrupted for seven hours a day on average". As a consequence, they note that public services, particularly health services, have suffered, posing "a serious risk to the treatment of patients". In addition, medical equipment is difficult to repair, and medical staff cannot leave to gain more training. Lastly, the ICRC note that sanitation is suffering, because construction projects lack the equipment needed, or the equipment is of poor quality. Only 60% of the population is connected to a sewerage collection system, with the rest polluting the Gaza aquifer. As a result, water is largely "unfit for consumption".

A 25 May 2010 United Nations Development Programme report stated that, as a result of the blockade, most of Gaza's manufacturing industry has closed, and unemployment stood at an estimated 40%, a decrease on previous years. The blockade has also prevented much needed construction, noting that almost "none of the 3,425 homes destroyed during Cast Lead have been reconstructed, displacing around 20,000 people". Less than 20% "of the value of the damages to educational facilities has been repaired", only "half of the damage to the power network has been repaired", "no repair has been made to the transport infrastructure", "a quarter of damaged farmland has been rehabilitated and only 40% of private businesses have been repaired".

An August 2012 report by UNRWA of the blockade's effects and general trends in Gaza forecasted that the region's population growth would outpace developments in economic infrastructure. In its press release, UN humanitarian coordinator Maxwell Gaylard said, "Gaza will have half a million more people by 2020 while its economy will grow only slowly. In consequence, the people of Gaza will have an even harder time getting enough drinking water and electricity, or sending their children to school."

A UN OCHA 2015 report stated that "longstanding access restrictions imposed by Israel have undermined Gaza's economy, resulting in high levels of unemployment, food insecurity and aid dependency," and that "Israeli restrictions on the import of basic construction materials and equipment have significantly deteriorated the quality of basic services, and impede the reconstruction and repair of homes."

=== Naval blockade ===
The Israeli Navy enforces a maritime blockade of the Port of Gaza and the coastline.

Under the Oslo II Accord, activities of the Palestinian Naval Police are restricted to 6 nautical miles (11 km) from the coast. Under the 1994 Gaza–Jericho Agreement, which was not implemented, Palestinian fishing was to be permitted up to 20 nautical miles (37 km) offshore. In 2007, Israel restricted fishermen travel to 6 nautical miles (11 km) offshore. Israeli officials said the restrictions were necessary because of past incidents of Palestinians using fishing boats for smuggling and attacks. Israeli patrol boats regularly patrol Gaza's coastline and fire on Palestinian fishing vessels that go beyond the permitted distance from shore. In July 2018, Israel further restricted the Gaza fishing space to 3 nautical miles (5.6 km).

Israel has intercepted a number of vessels attempting to bring supplies into Gaza, claiming that they may be providing goods that may be used to build arms. A humanitarian mission organised by the Free Gaza Movement, with Cynthia McKinney and Mairead Maguire on board, was intercepted by Israel attempting to sail to Gaza. They were deported but the supplies were later delivered to Gaza over land by truck.

On 29 April 2014, Gaza's Ark, a vessel being converted in Gaza from a fishing boat to carry cargo to Europe, was sunk by an explosion following a telephone warning to the guard, who was uninjured. The organisers of the project suspect that Israel forces are responsible.

Between 2000 and 2018, Al Mezan Center for Human Rights has documented 1,283 incidents involving Palestinian fishermen, including 1,192 shooting incidents that led to the death of 8 fishermen and to the injury of 134 fishermen. During these incidents, 656 fishermen were detained, and 209 boats were confiscated.

==== Effect on the fishing industry ====
Al Jazeera report on the effects on the fishing industry

The sea blockade has caused damage to Gaza fishing industry.

The UN Office for the Coordination of Humanitarian Affairs has estimated that Gaza fishermen need to journey at least 12–15 nautical miles from shore to catch larger shoals, and sardines in particular are 6 nmi (11 km) offshore. Shoals closer to shore have been depleted. The total catch pre-blockade in 1999 was nearly 4,000 tons, this was reduced to 2,700 tons in 2008. In the 90s, the Gaza fishing industry was worth $10 million annually or 4% of the total Palestinian economy; this was halved between 2001 and 2006. 45,000 Palestinians were employed in the fishing industry, employed in jobs such as catching fish, repairing nets and selling fish. Fish also provided much-needed animal protein to Gazans' diet.

The International Committee of the Red Cross also notes that "90% of Gaza's 4000 fishermen are now considered either poor (with a monthly income of between US$100 and US$190) or very poor (earning less than US$100 a month), up from 50% in 2008." Nezar Ayyash, head of Gaza's fishermen's union, is quoted as saying that he has been arrested and his boat confiscated several times. According to the Palestinian Fishermen's Syndicate, there are 3,800 registered fishermen in the Gaza Strip. Only 2,000 of them are currently working as a result of restrictions, constant attacks and growing cost of fishing equipment.

=== Energy restrictions ===
Almost all of Gaza's liquid fuel and about half of its electricity are supplied by Israel, while Gaza's sole power plant runs on crude diesel imported via Israel. In normal times, Israel exempts from the blockade fuel for the power plant as well as for essential services such as hospitals, and does not cut electricity supplies. But during times of conflict, Israel has disrupted supplies. In late October 2007, in response to persistent rocket fire on southern Israel, Israel cut diesel exports to Gaza by 15% and gasoline exports by 10%, and created targeted electrical outages for 15 minutes after a rocket attack. According to Israeli officials, the energy flow to hospitals and Israeli shipments of crude diesel to Gaza's sole power plant was unaffected. The Israeli government argued that these limited energy cuts were a nonviolent way to protest Hamas rocket attacks.

The next day, Attorney General of Israel Menachem Mazuz suspended the electricity cuts, and the Israeli Supreme Court gave the government three days to justify its energy cuts policy.

On 1 December 2007, the Israeli Supreme Court ruled that the electricity cuts were unlawful, and ordered the Israeli military to stop them by the following day, but also allowed Israel to continue reducing its diesel and gasoline shipments to Gaza.

=== Control of Gazan air space ===
The Oslo Accords interim peace agreements expressly give Israel security control over Gazan airspace and coastal waters. Gazan air space is controlled by radar. There are regular overflights by Israeli fighter jets and a surveillance balloon is tethered near the Erez crossing. Unmanned aerial vehicles patrol the sky for surveillance, also engaging in missile strikes targeting people and infrastructure; these drones produce a nearly constant buzzing noise audible from the ground and are therefore referred to by Palestinians in Gaza as zanana.

=== Limitation of basic goods ===
Israel allows limited humanitarian supplies from aid organizations into the Gaza Strip, but not dual-use items, which can also be used for military purposes. According to the Coordinator of Government Activities in the Territories of the Israel Defense Forces, in May 2010, this included over 1.5 million litres of diesel fuel and gasoline, fruits and vegetables, wheat, sugar, meat, chicken and fish products, dairy products, animal feed, hygiene products, clothing and shoes.

According to Gisha, items that have at various times been denied importation into Gaza in 2010 include ordinary consumer goods such as jam, candles, books, musical instruments, shampoo, A4 paper, and livestock such as chicken, donkeys, and cows. The UN Office for the Coordination of Humanitarian Affairs (COGAT) also lists wheelchairs, dry food items, crayons, stationery, and soccer balls as shipments that Israeli authorities have prevented from entering Gaza. International aid group Mercy Corps said it was blocked from sending 90 tons of macaroni and other foodstuffs. After international pressure, Israeli authorities said that they were giving the shipment a green light. Israel was also reported to have prevented aid groups from sending in other items, such as paper, art supplies, tomato paste and lentils. Because of an Israeli ban on the importation of construction materials such as cement and steel, which could be used to build bunkers for military use by Hamas, the UN Relief and Works Agency started to build mud brick homes.

Aid agencies say that while food and other essential supplies pile up in warehouses and await trucks at crossing points, Israel's COGAT, which controls access to Gaza, routinely rejects or delays shipments, often without explanation. Humanitarian workers and officials describe the approval process as arbitrary and sometimes contradictory. Even minor issues, such as a single item deemed problematic, can result in the entire truck being turned back, forcing it to restart a lengthy clearance process that may take weeks. Items have been rejected as "luxuries", including chocolate croissants, or flagged as potential dual-use goods: a truckload of green sleeping bags was turned away because COGAT associated the color with the military.

Since early January 2026, Israel has permitted certain commercial traders to import and sell items classified as dual-use in Gaza while humanitarian organisations remain prohibited from bringing in the same goods. Under this system, private-sector shipments of items such as generators and metal pallets have been allowed to enter Gaza through Israeli-controlled crossings. Aid officials and humanitarian agencies have said this has made essential items available primarily through commercial markets, where they are sold at significantly higher prices, limiting access for much of the civilian population. Dual-use items barred since the start of the Gaza war include wheelchairs, walkers, crutches, solar panels, and smoke detectors. Critics of these restrictions, including United Nations agencies and human rights organisations, say their broad scope has impeded repairs to critical civilian infrastructure, including water and sanitation systems, worsening the humanitarian situation. They argue that restrictions on reconstruction materials have had a greater documented impact on civilian life than allegations of diversion cited by Israeli authorities.

==== Limitation system ====
In September 2007, the Israeli cabinet voted to tighten the restrictions on the Gaza strip. The cabinet decision stated, "the movement of goods into the Gaza Strip will be restricted; the supply of gas and electricity will be reduced; and restrictions will be imposed on the movement of people from the Strip and to it."

In January 2010, the Israeli group Gisha took Israeli authorities to court, forcing them to reveal which goods were permitted and which goods were not. The Israeli government replied that canned fruit, fruit juices and chocolate are blocked, while at the same time canned meat, canned tuna, mineral water, sesame paste, tea and coffee are allowed into the Gaza Strip. Banned items also included coriander, shampoo and shoes.

In October 2010, papers were released which revealed a system to maintain the minimum level of basic goods entering the Strip. It contained upper and lower warning lines, identifying surpluses and shortages of listed products in Gaza.

In October 2012, an Israeli court forced Israel's Coordinator of Government Activities in the Territories (COGAT) to release a document that detailed "red lines" for "food consumption in the Gaza strip" during the 2007 blockade. According to the COGAT, the document was a rough draft, and never actually implemented. He want on further to say that there was never even any discussion after the document had been drafted. The document calculates the minimum number of calories necessary to keep Gazans from malnutrition and avoid a humanitarian crisis. This number was converted to a number of daily truckloads, the number being decreased to account for food produced in Gaza, and further on the basis of "culture and experience" of the Gazans. This reduction, if implemented, would have resulted in an increase in sugar and a decrease in fruits, vegetables, milk, and meat. Gisha, an Israeli human-rights group, said that in fact the number of truckloads allowed into Gaza was less than stipulated in the calculation. The UN said that if the policy was intended to cap food imports, it would go against humanitarian principles. The body responsible for the calculation said its intent was to ensure no shortages occur, not to cap food imports. Israeli officials now acknowledge the restrictions were partly meant to pressure Hamas by making the lives of Gazans difficult.

Israel limits the amount of load the trucks may carry, ostensibly for security reasons. In the past, the total height of goods stacked on trucks was not allowed to exceed 1.2 meters. The Israeli authorities did not explain why they did not use to its full potential the scanner, donated by the Dutch government and calibrated according to the military's specifications, which can scan at a height of 2 meters. In February 2016, the allowed height was increased to 1.5 meters.

== Legality of the blockade ==
While the blockade's legality has not been adjudicated in court, several non-judicial entities have expressed opinions. International law regards a blockade as an act of war. Laws of war define a blockade as encirclement of an area and prevention of access to it with the aim to make the enemy surrender through deprivation and isolation. It is a legitimate means of warfare. Security Council Resolution 1373, adopted on 28 September 2001 after the September 11 attacks on the United States, obliges all member states to prohibit making resources available to militant organizations. The Fourth Geneva Convention allows humanitarian assistance to be denied if there is a serious concern that it will be delivered to those who are not innocent civilians and create an advantage for the enemy.

Former UN Secretary-General Ban Ki-moon, the United Nations Human Rights Council (UNHRC), and other human rights organizations have criticized the blockade. In 2011, a panel of UN experts concluded that the naval blockade of Gaza constituted collective punishment and in doing so violated international law, contradicting a previous UN investigation that declared it was legal.

The International Committee of the Red Cross (ICRC) termed Israel's blockade of Gaza "collective punishment" in violation of international humanitarian law. In 2010 it also called the blockade a violation of the Geneva Conventions and called for its lifting.

The 2010 UNHRC Report on the Flotilla Incident also noted that the naval blockade and other travel restrictions imposed on the Gaza Strip had tripled "abject poverty" among refugees in the territory, making 61 per cent of households food insecure causing "disproportionate damage to the civilian population".

In 2009, George Bisharat argued that when the blockade was tightened in 2007, Israel constituted an occupying power under customary international law and therefore had an affirmative duty to provide food and medical supplies under Article 55 of the Fourth Geneva Convention. He further claimed that the tightening constituted a collective punishment of the population of Gaza for Hamas's 2006 electoral victory, violating Article 33 of the Fourth Geneva Convention.

A 2011 policy paper by Foundation for Political, Economic and Social Research stated that the "arguments that conditions required for declaring a blockade are actually met in the case of Israeli blockade of Gaza" were both inadequate and a misinterpretation of international law. In addition, Israel's overarching argument directed at Gazans that "you have elected Hamas, now endure its consequences" amounted to collective punishment and was illegal.

Law professor Noura Erakat wrote in 2012 that Israel's blockade was "illegal pursuant to international humanitarian law because it contravenes its obligations towards a civilian population living under its occupation" and said this had been covered at length by various commentators and human rights organizations.

The Global International Humanitarian Law Centre of Diakonia published in 2014 that:

... as outlined by the Hague Regulations (1899/1907), a territory is considered occupied when it is placed under the effective control of a hostile army. The Gaza Strip remains under belligerent occupation as Israel continues to retain effective control over significant aspects of civil life in the Gaza Strip on a daily basis as well as directly exercising certain elements of governing control over the territory and the people of the Gaza Strip. For as long as Israel maintains effective control over the Gaza Strip, it must fully comply with its obligations under IHL and IHRL, as the occupying power. This includes providing for the welfare of the occupied Palestinian population therein.

Filippo Grandi, Commissioner General of the UNRWA, said in 2014 that "Israel's blockade is illegal and [it] must be lifted ... the siege on the Gaza Strip which has been imposed on the Gaza Strip for more than half a decade is considered the longest in history; longer than that of Sarajevo, Berlin and Leningrad", adding that "the world should not forget about the security of the people of Gaza ... Their security is worth the same as everybody else's security so we appeal to the humanitarian sense of all."

UNRWA also referred to the blockade as illegal as it entered its tenth year in June 2016, saying that it was one of "the principle causes of the socio-economic and psychosocial crisis in Gaza". Amnesty International called in 2017 for the lifting of the "illegal blockade", warning of a "looming humanitarian catastrophe".

== Reactions ==
=== Palestinian ===
==== Fatah ====
Linked with the conflict following his party's loss in the 2006 election, Palestinian president Mahmoud Abbas approved the Egyptian border restrictions by the new regime, purportedly aimed at protecting Egypt from danger. In 2014 and subsequent years, Abbas supported Egypt's crackdown on smuggling tunnels and welcomed the flooding of the tunnels by Egypt in coordination with the PA.

In 2010, Abbas declared that he opposed lifting the Israeli naval blockade of the Gaza Strip because this would bolster Hamas. Egypt also supported this position.

In 2016, Abbas objected to the entrance of Qatari fuel to the Gaza electricity plant via Israel, because his PA would be unable to collect taxes on the fuel.

In 2016 most Palestinian parties welcomed Turkish initiatives to end the strict Israeli siege on the Gaza Strip by building a seaport for the movement of people and goods. This step was condemned by Fatah and the PA, a senior Fatah leader saying that his movement would not allow this to happen, while the Fatah Executive Committee said this was an Israeli trick to separate Gaza from the West Bank. In turn a Hamas official condemned the PA's position; "This position proves that the PA is part of the Israeli-led siege which has been imposed on Gaza for ten years".

In 2017, the PA government imposed its own sanctions against Gaza, including, among other things, cutting off salaries to thousands of PA employees, as well as financial assistance to hundreds of families in the Gaza Strip. The PA initially said it would stop paying for the electricity and fuel that Israel supplies to the Gaza Strip, but after a year partially backtracked.

=== Israel ===
Israel Since 2005, Israel asserts that it ended its occupation of Gaza when it disengaged from the coastal strip in 2005. After Israel's unilateral disengagement plan from the Gaza strip, Israel no longer has troops stationed within Gaza. Israel has retained control over Gaza's airspace and coastline, and over its own border with the territory. Egypt has control of its border with Gaza. Israel and Egypt also control the flow of goods in and out. Israel controls fuel imports to Gaza, and also controls the majority of electricity used in Gaza (approximately 60%), which it supplies from the Israeli electrical grid. There have been a series of attacks by Israeli ground forces such as the 2008–2009 Israel–Gaza conflict, as well as rocket attacks on Israel and cross-border attacks by Gazan militant groups against Israeli troops.

In September 2007, citing an intensification of Qassam rocket attacks, Israel restricted the transfer of electricity, fuel, and other supplies into Gaza. Israel said the blockade's purpose was to pressure Hamas into ending the rocket attacks and to deprive them of the supplies necessary for the continuation of rocket attacks. Israel argues that it is not legally responsible for Gaza beyond whatever is necessary to avoid a humanitarian crisis.

According to a US Congressional Research Service report:

While there are differing views in Israel concerning the Gaza blockade ... most Israelis equate security with survival and peace. Israel's leaders appear to believe that the blockade of the Gaza Strip [among other security and deterrence measures], have brought about a quiet. ... As of the date of the Gaza flotilla incident, no Israeli had been killed in a terrorist or in a cross-border rocket attack in more than a year. Therefore, the Israeli government is reluctant to abandon the blockade tactic ... from its perspective.

Israeli Prime Minister Netanyahu maintained that the blockade is necessary to prevent weapons from reaching Gaza, saying, "it's our obligation—as well as our right in accordance to international law and to common sense—to prevent these weapons from entering by air, sea, and land." Of the Gaza Freedom Flotilla, he said: "Had the blockade been breached, this flotilla would have been followed by dozens, by hundreds of ships. The amount of weapons that can be transported aboard a ship is totally different from what we saw get through the tunnels." He argued that the consequences of Israel's failure to maintain the blockade would be "an Iranian port in Gaza, only a few dozen kilometers from Tel Aviv and Jerusalem."

According to an Israeli government document:

A country has the right to decide that it chooses not to engage in economic relations or to give economic assistance to the other party to the conflict, or that it wishes to operate using 'economic warfare'.

An Israeli government spokesman added in 2010 that the blockade is intended to bring about a political goal and that Israel "could not lift the embargo altogether as long as Hamas remains in control" of Gaza.

Speaking in 2006, Dov Weisglass, an advisor to Israeli Prime Minister Ehud Olmert, allegedly said that, "The idea is to put the Palestinians on a diet, but not to make them die of hunger." Although this quote is widely reported, the original quote appears to have been: "It's like an appointment with a dietician. The Palestinians will get a lot thinner, but won't die." Weisglass has denied this report.

According to US diplomatic cables obtained by the WikiLeaks organization, diplomats stationed in the US embassy in Tel Aviv were briefed by Israelis on the blockade of the Gaza Strip. One of the cables states that "as part of their overall embargo plan against Gaza, Israeli officials have confirmed (...) on multiple occasions that they intend to keep the Gazan economy on the brink of collapse without quite pushing it over the edge".

=== Egypt ===
Egypt Egypt's argument is that it cannot open Rafah crossing unless the Palestinian Authority headed by Mahmoud Abbas controls the crossing and international monitors are present. Egypt Foreign Minister Ahmed Aboul Gheit said Hamas wants the border opened because it would represent Egyptian recognition of the group's control of Gaza. "Of course this is something we cannot do," he said, "because it would undermine the legitimacy of the Palestinian Authority and consecrate the split between Gaza and the West Bank."

According to Sharif Elmusa, Associate Professor of Political Science at the American University in Cairo, Israel wants Gaza to fade into Egypt. Egyptian authorities are determined to avoid opening the Rafah crossing without ending the Israeli siege, which would ultimately serve Israel's goal of displacing the Gaza problem onto Egypt. Secondly it is Cairo's concern that under Hamas rule violence can spill into Sinai and threaten tourism, leaving Egypt vulnerable to US and Israeli accusations of ineffectively fighting terrorism.

Following the events of the Gaza flotilla raid in May 2010, after Egypt opened its borders with Gaza, it was reported that former Egyptian President Hosni Mubarak was caught between the need to appease growing public anger at Israel's actions and the necessity of maintaining his close relationship with Israel. This friendship was needed to secure more than $2bn of American aid annually, money on which many analysts believe Mubarak's former regime depended.

While Israel contends that the blockade is necessary to prevent smuggling of weapons into Gaza, Egypt argues that it is needed to prevent smuggling of them from Gaza into the Sinai.

In the 2014 Israel-Gaza conflict, Israel claimed that over 30 underground attack tunnels were discovered under the Gaza-Israel border which are used by militants in order to infiltrate Israel. It also claimed that over 600,000 tons of cement required to construct the tunnels was originally designated for humanitarian aid and diverted.

=== United States ===
Although the United States officially supports the blockade, in February 2010 Secretary of State Hillary Clinton urged Israeli minister of defence Ehud Barak to ease it. The US has long pressed Israel to ease restrictions on Gaza. Of the Gaza flotilla raid on 31 May 2010, Clinton said, "The situation in Gaza is unsustainable and unacceptable." Of the impending second Gaza flotilla, she said, "the Gaza flotilla is not necessary or useful." In June 2010, Clinton said the humanitarian needs in the Hamas-controlled area must be met along with legitimate Israeli security concerns.

=== The United Nations ===
On 24 January 2008, the United Nations Human Rights Council released a statement calling for Israel to lift its siege on the Gaza Strip, allow the continued supply of food, fuel, and medicine, and reopen border crossings. According to The Jerusalem Post, this was the 15th time in less than two years the council had condemned Israel for its human rights record regarding the Palestinian territories. Israel and the United States boycotted the proceedings. Before that, U.N. Undersecretary-General for Humanitarian Affairs John Holmes called the blockade "collective punishment", saying, "We all understand the security problems and the need to respond to that but collective punishment of the people of Gaza is not, we believe, the appropriate way to do that."

On 15 December 2008, after a statement in which he called the embargo on Gaza a crime against humanity, United Nations Special Rapporteur Richard A. Falk was prevented from entering the Palestinian territories by Israeli authorities and expelled from the region. Israeli ambassador to the United Nations Itzhak Levanon said the Special Rapporteur's mandate was "hopelessly unbalanced", "redundant at best and malicious at worst".

In August 2009, U.N. human rights chief Navi Pillay criticised Israel for the blockade in a 34-page report, calling it a violation of the rules of war.

In March 2010, United Nations Secretary-General Ban Ki-moon said the blockade was causing "unacceptable suffering" and that families were living in "unacceptable, unsustainable conditions".

A UN Fact Finding mission in September 2009 led by South African Judge Richard Goldstone (the Goldstone report) concluded that the blockade was possibly a crime against humanity, and recommended that the matter be referred to the International Criminal Court if the situation had not improved in six months.

In May 2010, the UN Office for the Coordination of Humanitarian Affairs said that Gaza's formal economy had collapsed since the imposition of the blockade, adding that the "restrictions imposed on the civilian population by the continuing blockade of the Gaza Strip amount to collective punishment, a violation of international humanitarian law."

In June 2010, United Nations envoy to the Middle East and former UK prime minister Tony Blair said:

The policy of Gaza is counter-productive and what [Israel] should be doing is allow material in to rebuild homes and sanitation and power and water systems and allow business to flourish. Nor do we in fact do damage to the position of Hamas by harming people in Gaza. People are harmed when the quality of service is poor and people cannot work.

He also called for Hamas to stop the "terrorism coming out of Gaza". In the same month, Robert Serry, the UN special envoy for Middle East peace process, said:

The flotilla crisis is the latest symptom of a failed policy. The situation in Gaza is unsustainable and the current policy is unacceptable and counter-productive, and requires a different, more positive strategy. The closure and blockade of the Gaza Strip needs to come to an end. There is now a welcome international consensus on Gaza.

In the September 2011 Palmer Report, the UN investigative committee for the 2010 Flotilla to Gaza said that Israel's naval blockade of Gaza was legal under international law, but criticised the nature of the Israeli raid. Later that month, five independent U.N. rights experts reporting to the U.N. Human Rights Council rejected that conclusion, saying the blockade had subjected Palestinians in Gaza to collective punishment in "flagrant contravention of international human rights and humanitarian law".

=== European Union ===
In May 2011, EU commissioner for humanitarian aid Kristalina Georgieva said the European Union and the United Nations were "calling for the immediate, sustained and unconditional opening of crossings for the flow of humanitarian aid, commercial goods and persons" after she and UN under secretary-general for humanitarian affairs and emergency relief Valerie Amos had met with Israeli defence minister Ehud Barak in Tel Aviv. She then said in an interview with Israel's Ynet that she believed the "humanitarian crisis...was artificially created because of the blockade" but added that a flotilla was not the correct response: "We are not in favor of attempts to help people in this way".

=== Turkey ===
Turkish prime minister Recep Tayyip Erdoğan harshly criticised the blockade, especially after the Gaza flotilla raid. Erdoğan raised the possibility of trying to forcibly breach the blockade by sending the Turkish Navy to escort any future flotilla or by trying to visit Gaza himself. The Turkish government made clear that it opposed the blockade and regarded it as illegal, and before the flotilla raid, issued a demand for safe passage. Turkish foreign minister Ahmet Davutoğlu said that Turkey was willing to normalize relations with Israel if it lifted the blockade. When Israel eased the blockade, the Turkish Foreign Ministry called it "a positive but insufficient step" and said, "Turkey considers that Israel's inhuman blockade of Gaza represents a threat to regional peace and stability and considers that the blockade must be entirely lifted."

=== Ireland ===
After visiting Gaza in March 2010, Irish foreign minister Micheál Martin called the Israeli blockade of Gaza "inhumane and unacceptable" and called on the European Union and other countries to increase pressure on Israel to lift the blockade. Martin was the first EU foreign minister to enter Gaza in over a year. He said that all the blockade achieved was to "enrich Hamas and marginalize even further the voices of moderation".

=== United Kingdom ===
During Prime Minister's Questions, UK prime minister David Cameron said, "Friends of Israel – and I count myself a friend of Israel – should be saying to the Israelis that the blockade actually strengthens Hamas's grip on the economy and on Gaza, and it's in their own interests to lift it and allow these vital supplies to get through. ... We should do everything we can through the UN, where resolution 1860 is absolutely clear about the need to end the blockade and to open up Gaza." In July 2010, Cameron called on Israel to relax the blockade. He said "Humanitarian goods and people must flow in both directions. Gaza cannot and must not be allowed to remain a prison camp." In response, Ephraim Sneh, former Israeli minister, said: "Cameron is right – Gaza is a prison camp, but those who control the prison are Hamas. I'm totally against the double standards of a nation which fights the Taliban but is showing its solidarity with their brothers, Hamas."

Nick Clegg, the deputy prime minister of the United Kingdom speaking after the Gaza flotilla raid, criticized the blockade saying "So the events of the last 24/48 hours confirm in my mind, as they do if you hear what William Hague and David Cameron have done and everyone in Government, the view that the blockade on Gaza is neither sustainable nor tenable in its present form." He also commented that "If we needed any confirmation about the unjustified and untenable blockade of Gaza, we have been reminded overnight of the need to lift this blockade. What is going on in Gaza is a humanitarian catastrophe. While of course Israel has every right to defend itself and its citizens from attack, we must now move towards lifting the blockade from Gaza as soon as possible."

William Hague, the foreign secretary, said in a prepared speech to the House of Commons that the blockade of Gaza was "unacceptable and unsustainable", and that it was "the view of the British government, including the previous government, that restrictions on Gaza should be lifted – a view confirmed in United Nations security council resolution 1860 which called for sustained delivery of humanitarian aid and which called on states to alleviate the humanitarian and economic situation", and that "current Israeli restrictions are counterproductive for Israel's long term security".

Acting Labour Leader Harriet Harman also said, "This blockade must end."

=== Humanitarian organizations ===
Human Rights Watch argues that Israel is still an occupying power and is responsible for Gaza under the 1949 Fourth Geneva Convention, which seeks to protect the civilian population.

Amnesty International said, "The blockade constitutes collective punishment under international law and must be lifted immediately", and that as the occupying power, Israel has a duty under international law to ensure the welfare of Gaza's inhabitants, including their rights to health, education, food and adequate housing.

On 7 March 2008, several international aid groups, including Amnesty International, CARE International UK, and Oxfam, issued a report saying that the humanitarian situation in the Gaza Strip was more acute than at any time since the beginning of the Israeli occupation in 1967. While critical of Palestinian militants firing rockets from Gaza into Israel, and acknowledging that "Israel has the right and obligation to protect its citizens", they said that as the "occupying power in Gaza" it also has a legal duty to ensure Gaza civilians have access to food, clean water, electricity and medical care. They urged Israel to lift the blockade, characterizing it as collective punishment against the territory's 1.5 million residents.

According to the ICRC, "The hardship faced by Gaza's 1.5 million people cannot be addressed by providing humanitarian aid. The only sustainable solution is to lift the closure." The ICRC also called the blockade "a collective punishment imposed in clear violation of Israel's obligations under international humanitarian law".

In May 2015, the Euro-Mediterranean Human Rights Monitor issued a report on the situation in Gaza nine months after the 2014 Israel–Gaza conflict. The report noted that the cost of relief, recovery, and reconstruction due to the war had reached $4 billion, but that of the $3.5 billion international donors pledged for Gaza's reconstruction, only $954 million had been disbursed as of early April. The report also shed light on the UNRWA financial crises that threatened the stability of its operation in Gaza and probably the humanitarian situation there. It accused Egyptian authorities of joining Israel in imposing a siege on Gaza. According to the report, Egypt had closed Rafah crossing 66% of the time in 2014, 100 days from the beginning of 2015 to May of the same year. As the world's attention had shifted away to other pressing issues, the report warned that, if the international community did not resume its responsibilities, Gaza would blow up into another war. The Euro-Mediterranean Human Rights Monitor called on the international community to take practical steps to end the blockade, on the Egyptian government to open Rafah crossing without any restrictions, and for support for the Palestinian call for a commercial seaport in Gaza that guaranteed free import and export of goods and private international travel.

=== Non-governmental organizations ===
Justus Weiner and Avi Bell of the pro-Israeli lobby group JCPA said that Israel's combat actions and blockade cannot be considered collective punishment. They cite Article 75(4)(b) of Protocol I Additional to the Geneva Conventions of 12 August 1949, which says the bar on collective punishment forbids the imposition of criminal-type penalties on individuals or groups on the basis of another's guilt, or the commission of acts that would otherwise violate the rules of distinction and/or proportionality. According to Weiner and Bell, the blockade does not "involve the imposition of criminal-type penalties or the violation of the rules of distinction and proportionality."

The Islamic Action Front (IAF), a Jordanian Islamist group, criticized Egypt for the blockade and accused it of "collaborating" with Israel and the United States. "The Egyptian authorities are ...increasing the suffering of the Palestinians in Gaza by building the steel wall and closing the border crossings with Gaza," said Hamzah Mansour, a member of the Shura Council of the IAF.

Gideon Rose of the Council on Foreign Relations has written that the blockade serves a secondary aim, which is to undermine Hamas by making life unpleasant for Gaza's residents.

=== Individuals ===
- Former U.S. president Jimmy Carter – In June 2009, Carter met with Hamas leaders in Gaza for three hours. Before his meeting with former Palestinian Prime Minister Ismail Haniyeh and other Hamas officials, Carter spoke forcefully against the economic blockade of Gaza. He told a crowd at an awards ceremony for UN refugee school pupils:
  The responsibility for this terrible human rights crime lies in Jerusalem, Cairo, Washington, and throughout the international community. This abuse must cease; the crimes must be investigated; the walls must be brought down, and the basic right of freedom must come to you.
- Pope Benedict XVI – During a May 2009 visit to Bethlehem, Benedict mentioned Gazans, saying: "Please be assured of my solidarity with you in the immense work of rebuilding which now lies ahead and my prayers that the embargo will soon be lifted."
- In August 2014, at the height of the 2014 Israel–Gaza conflict, Carter and former president of Ireland Mary Robinson called for a UN-mandated lifting of the blockade.
- In November 2026, Formula One driver Lewis Hamilton said that Israel should let aid trucks into Gaza after visiting the Rafah Border Crossing in Egypt. He has often posted on social media about children harmed in airstrikes and has called for a ceasefire. Aid reaching Gaza remains inadequate.

== International relief ==
Following the 2014 Gaza War, a donors conference was held in Egypt where different countries committed to donate total sum of US$5.4 billion. In September 2014, Turkey proposed sending a powership to Gaza to ease the shortage of electricity, but in December 2014 Israel rejected the proposal stating that the infrastructure in Gaza was not compatible with the ship.

== See also ==
- 2006 Palestinian legislative election
- Criticism of Israel
- Egypt–Gaza border
- Egypt–Israel relations
- Gaza–Israel barrier
- Gaza–Israel conflict
- Gaza Strip § History
- Legal assessments of the Gaza flotilla raid
- Operation Bringing Home the Goods
- Palestinian rocket attacks on Israel
