= Port of Gaza =

Port in Gaza, Palestine

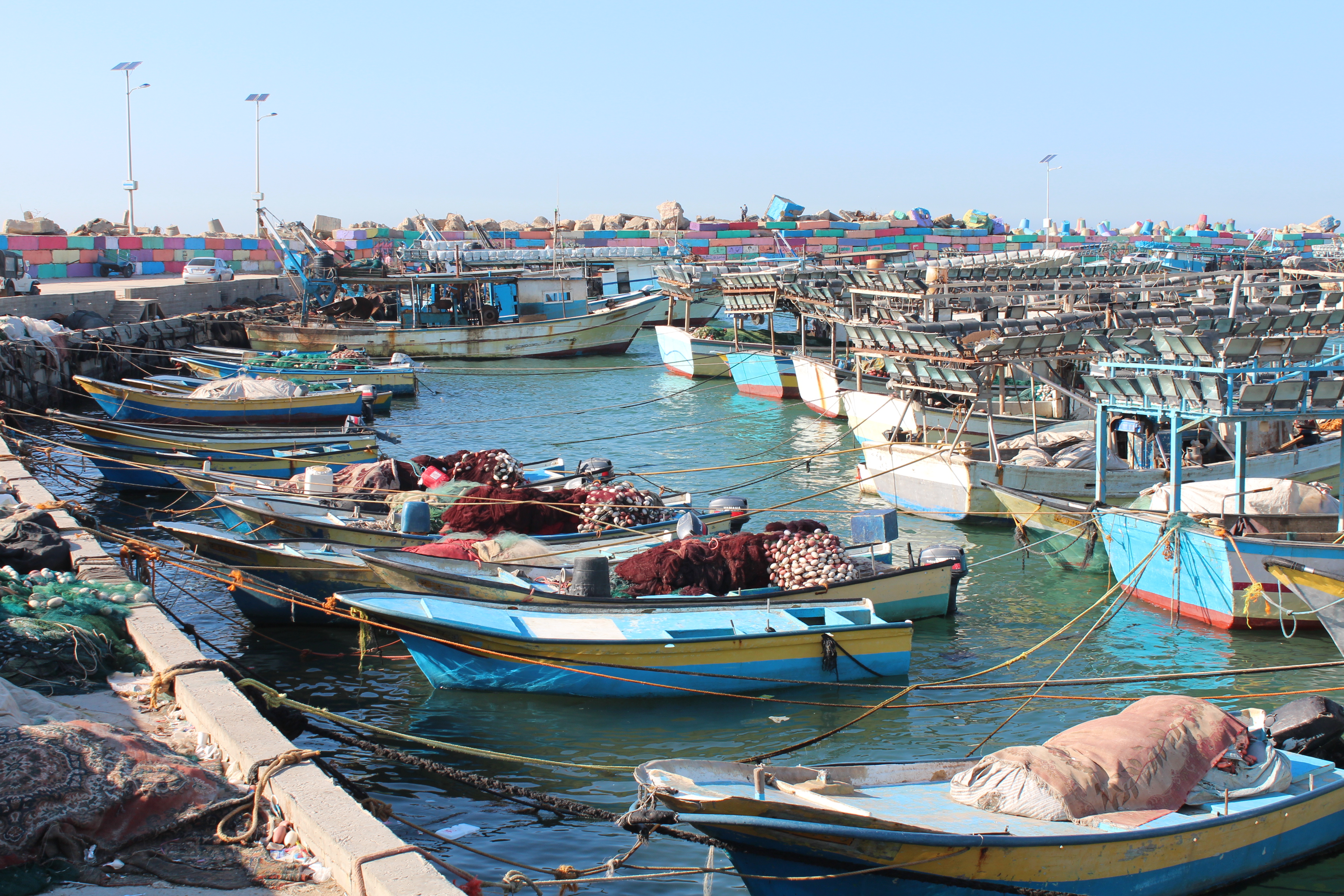
- Gaza port, 2015
- Interactive map of Port of Gaza
- Location within Gaza City

Location
- Country: State of Palestine
- Location: Gaza Governorate, Gaza Strip
- Coordinates: 31°31′33″N 34°25′50″E
- Grid position: 096/104 PAL
- UN/LOCODE: PSGZA

Details
- Operated by: Palestinian National Authority
- Land area: 48,000 m^{2} (520,000 sq ft)
- No. of piers: 970 and 330 m (3,180 and 1,080 ft)

The Port of Gaza is a small port near the Rimal district of Gaza City, Gaza. It is the home port of Palestinian fishing-boats and the base of the Palestinian Naval Police, a branch of the Palestinian National Security Forces. Under the Oslo II Accord, the activities of the Palestinian Naval Police are restricted to 6 nautical miles from the coast. Since 2007, the Port of Gaza has been under an Israeli-imposed naval blockade as part of a blockade of the Gaza Strip, and activities at the port have been restricted to small-scale fishing.

The nautical access restrictions imposed during Israel's siege of Gaza confine the port to limited uses.

== History ==
=== Gaza Strip ===
The Gaza Strip has been put under a strict blockade, by land, air, and sea. Having total surface area of 362 square kilometers, the transportation system in the strip is in poor condition with only 76 kilometres (47 mi) of main roads, 122 kilometres (76 mi) of regional roads, and 99 kilometres (62 mi) of local roads. Formerly the Gaza strip had a small airport located at Rafah, but the airport was destroyed in 2001 by Israel. The port was built by the Palestinian National Authority (PNA).

=== Maiuma ===
In earlier times, the port of Maiuma, or el Mineh (Arabic for "the harbour"), was located in the area. In the late Ottoman era, Pierre Jacotin named the place Majumas on his map from 1799.

In 1883, the PEF's Survey of Western Palestine (SWP) noted that el Mineh was probably the ancient Maiuma.

In 2011, eight Roman columns believed to be the remains of a church were swept ashore during a storm. In 2013, the Palestinian Naval Police found ancient artifacts that included poles and baked clay.

=== Since 1994 ===
In 2002, Israeli forces attacked the Palestinian Naval Police facilities in the port, after Naval Police commanders were implicated in the Karine A affair, an attempt to secretly bring in 50 tons of weapons by boat into Gaza.

In 2007, following Hamas' takeover of Gaza, Israel imposed a blockade of the Gaza Strip, including a naval blockade. Several attempts to break the Israeli blockade have been made. Israel has prevented most ships from docking at the Port of Gaza, but did allow two boats, carrying activists and some supplies, to reach the port in 2008. As at 2010, the port was restricted to smaller Palestinian fishing boats.

In 2010, the port was deepened by Hamas in preparation for the arrival of a blockade-breaking flotilla of larger international ships.

=== Gaza war ===
The port and more than 90% of docked vessels were destroyed by Israel during the Gaza war; the damage included targeted aerial strikes on fishing vessels and maritime artillery impacts.

== Gaza Seaport plans ==
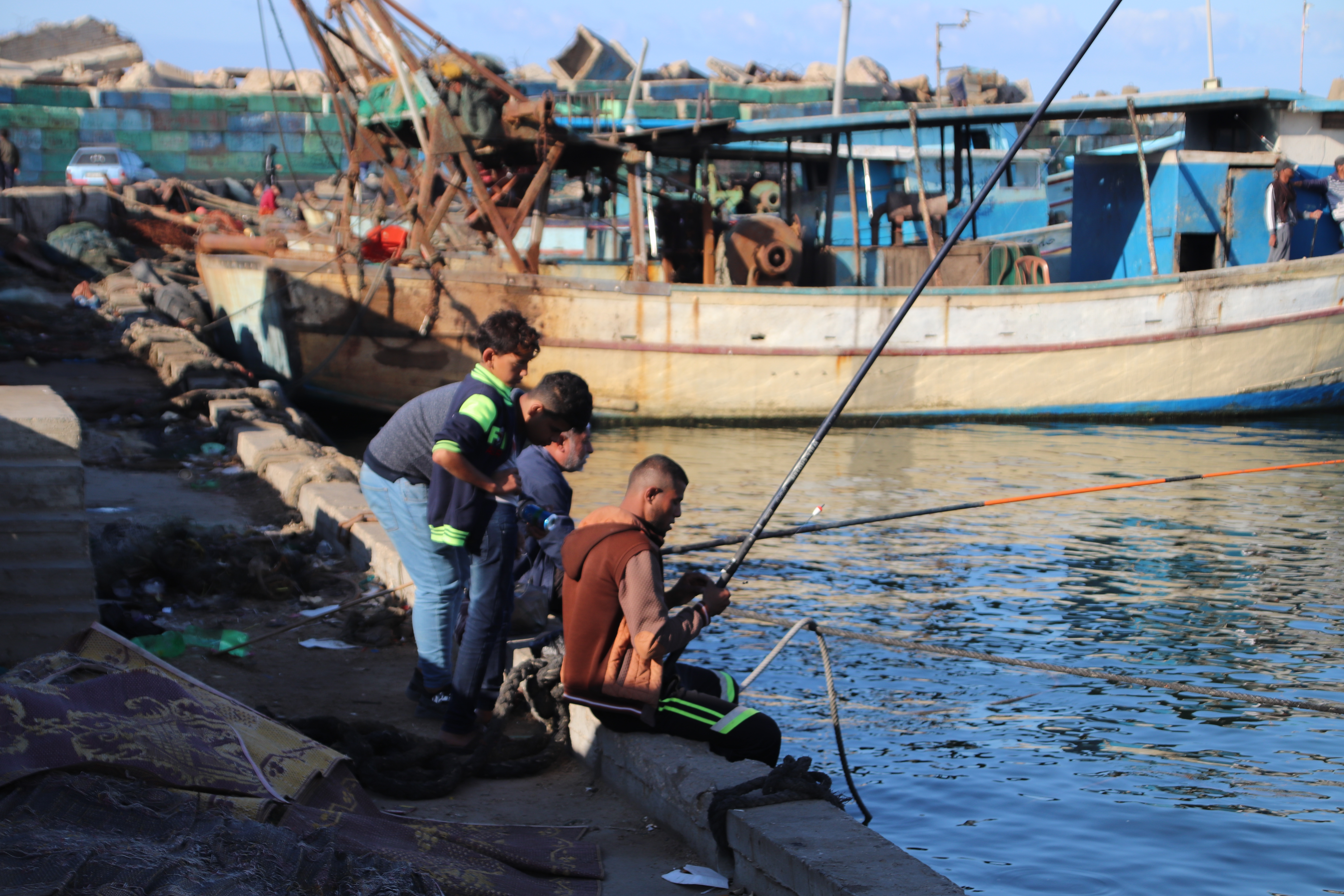
Fishermen at the port in 2019

Since the 1993 Oslo I Accord, there have been plans to build a much larger seaport in Gaza. Due to the continued Israeli–Palestinian conflict, these plans have not materialized as of 2024.

In 2005, Israel approved Palestinian plans to rebuild and complete the construction of a port a few miles south of Gaza City, which had begun before the outbreak of the Second Intifada in September 2000. The building was destroyed by Israeli forces together with Gaza's existing airport near Rafah following the outbreak of the Second Intifada.

== U.S.-installed floating pier ==
In 2024, the United States Army and Navy began constructing a floating pier at the Port of Gaza to bring in food to the people of the Gaza Strip. The pier was actually built in next door Israel and moved to Gaza. The United States and other countries also built an offshore platform a kilometre away from this pier. The aid was moved from the platform to this pier. On 20 May, the pier was damaged due to rains and wind. In July 2024, the pier was permanently dismantled.

== Bibliography ==
- Conder, C.R.; Kitchener, H.H. (1883). The Survey of Western Palestine: Memoirs of the Topography, Orography, Hydrography, and Archaeology. Vol. 3. London: Committee of the Palestine Exploration Fund.
- Doughty, Dick; El Aydi, Mohammed (1995). Gaza: legacy of occupation--a photographer's journey. Kumarian Press. ISBN 1-56549-044-4.
- Karmon, Y. (1960). "An Analysis of Jacotin's Map of Palestine" (PDF). Israel Exploration Journal. 10 (3, 4): 155–173, 244–253.
- Palmer, E.H. (1881). The Survey of Western Palestine: Arabic and English Name Lists Collected During the Survey by Lieutenants Conder and Kitchener, R. E. Transliterated and Explained by E.H. Palmer. Committee of the Palestine Exploration Fund.
