= Air Police (Palestine) =

Aerial service branch of the Palestinian National Security Forces

Palestinian Air Police
- الشرطة الجوية الفلسطينية
- Founded: 1994; 32 years ago
- Country: Palestine
- Type: Police aviation
- Part of: Palestinian National Security Forces
- Headquarters: Ramallah, Palestine

The Palestinian Air Police (PAP), also known as the Palestinian Air Force (PAF), is the aerial branch of the Palestinian National Security Forces (PNSF) that is responsible for all matters related to aircraft and airstrips in the State of Palestine.

== Origins ==
The Palestinian Air Police was established in 1994 following the issuance of a presidential decree changing the name of the Palestinian Air Force to Palestinian Air Police based on a decision of Palestinian president Yasser Arafat.

== Missions ==
The tasks of the Palestinian Air Police are to fully supervise the helicopters belonging to the Palestinian president, as the Air Police is responsible for the take-off, landing and security of all aircraft entering the territory of the State of Palestine, in addition to supervising all approved airstrips in the Palestinian governorates.

== West Bank landslides ==
The Palestinian Air Force has helipads in the cities of Ramallah, Tulkarm, Bethlehem and Jenin.

== See also ==
- Palestinian National Authority
- Palestinian Airlines
