= Moussa Arafat =

Palestinian politician (1940–2005)

Moussa Arafat al-Qudwa

Head of the General Security Branch
- In office 2004–2005

Personal details
- Born: 23 January 1940 Jaffa, Palestine
- Died: 7 September 2005 (aged 65) Gaza City, Palestine
- Party: Fatah
- Children: Manhal Arafat (son)
- Relatives: Yasser Arafat (cousin)

Moussa Arafat al-Qudwa (Arabic: موسى عرفات; 23 January 1940 – 7 September 2005) was a Palestinian politician, one of the founders of Fatah and a leading official in the Fatah Revolutionary Council. He was a cousin of Palestinian President Yasser Arafat.

== Career ==
Moussa Arafat was chief of the Palestinian Military Intelligence Service in the 1990s. In 2004, he was head of the general security branch in the Gaza Strip. In July 2004, Arafat was nominated head of the Palestinian Security Services in West Bank and Gaza Strip. This nomination and corruption claims against Arafat's family were partially the catalyst for intense armed conflict in the streets of Gaza between Palestinian 'militants' of the al-Aqsa Martyrs' Brigade group and fighters loyal to Chairman Arafat's Fatah.

Following the conflict, Yasser Arafat reshuffled the Gaza security apparatus and appointed Abdel-Razek al-Majaideh to the new post of overall director of security for the West Bank and Gaza, outranking Moussa Arafat.

In April 2005, Arafat was removed from his position as security chief but was subsequently named as adviser on military affairs with ministerial rank.

A power struggle between rival Palestinian factions emerged in Gaza and the West Bank in anticipation of Israeli Prime Minister Ariel Sharon's plan to withdraw troops and settlers from the occupied territory by the end of 2005.

In 2003, Arafat escaped injury in an explosion in his office caused by rockets fired, he claimed, by Palestinian enemies. In October 2004, Moussa Arafat and a top security official in the Gaza Strip, survived a car bomb that exploded in his convoy. Israel's military denied involvement.

== Death in militant raid ==
Shortly before 5 AM on 7 September 2005, dozens of masked gunmen (estimates of their number range from 80 to 100) in a convoy of about 20 vehicles, and armed with assault rifles and anti-tank grenades, stormed Arafat's home in Gaza. After a gunfight with Arafat, the gunmen dragged Arafat outside, and shot him dead.

While Arafat's home was near a security forces headquarters and only 300–400 metres from Palestinian Authority president Mahmoud Abbas's residence, media reports reported that the police had not came to the scene until 7 AM, two hours after the incident.

== Aftermath of Moussa Arafat's assassination ==
Mohammed Abdel Al, a spokesman for the Popular Resistance Committees (PRC), a militant group, claimed responsibility for Arafat's assassination, saying it killed Arafat to punish him for corruption after the Palestinian security forces had taken no action against him. The PRC consists mainly of former members of the Fatah movement, who have accused Palestinian leaders of graft.

Mahmoud Abbas pledged to track down Arafat's killers but nothing was done. The main suspects are Palestinian offshoot groups.

Arafat's oldest son, Manhal, and three bodyguards were kidnapped by the gunmen who killed Arafat. The bodyguards were released shortly thereafter, but Manhal was held for a day before being released to an Egyptian government delegation in Gaza.

== See also ==
- Salah al-Zawawi
