= Military Intelligence (Palestine) =

Intelligence body of the Palestinian National Security Forces

Military Intelligence Service Palestinian Military Intelligence الاستخبارات العسكرية

Agency overview
- Formed: 1994

Jurisdictional structure
- National agency: Palestine
- Operations jurisdiction: Palestine

Operational structure
- Agency executive: Nidal Shaheen, Director General of the Military Intelligence Service

Website
- pmi.pna.ps

The Palestinian Military Intelligence Service (PMIS; Arabic: الاستخبارات العسكرية, romanized: Al-Istikhbārāt al-ʻAskarīyah, lit. 'the Military Intelligence') is one of the main security agencies in the State of Palestine, established in 1994 following the establishment of the Palestinian National Authority.

== Origins ==
The Palestinian Military Intelligence Service was established in 1994 by a decision of the President of Palestine, Yasser Arafat.

On 11 June 2005, Major General Nasser Yousef, Minister of Interior and National Security, decided to merge the Special Units in the Northern Governorates into the Military Intelligence Service, and appointed Bashir Nafi as its head.

On 5 April 2014, Palestinian President Mahmoud Abbas decided to grant the Palestinian intelligence service the status of a judicial officer.

== Functions ==
The main tasks of the Palestinian Military Intelligence Service are summarized as follows:

- Gather information about the "external enemy", while tracking all information directly related to the Palestinian National Security Forces.
- Protecting the Palestinian National Security Forces from any harmful activities or security risks, such as espionage.
- Follow up and treat the defects, problems, or violations of the Palestinian security establishment.

== List of directors general ==
List of Directors General of the Military Intelligence Service of the State of Palestine
No.	Image	Name	Start date	End date
1		Moussa Arafat	1995	2005
2		Ahmed Abd El-Karim	2005	2005
3		Hisham Obeid	2006	2006
4		Jamal Al-Akkad	2007	2007
5		Nidal Abu Dukhan	2009	2012
6		Ibrahim Sameh Suleiman Al-Balawi	2012	2015
7		Zakaria Musleh	2015	2025
8		Nidal Shaheen	2025	Incumbent

List of Directors General of the Military Intelligence Service in the Northern Palestinian Governorates (West Bank)
No.	Image	Name	Start date	End date
1		Bashir Nafi	12 June 2005	9 November 2005
2		Marwan Abu Fadda	2005	2006
3		Suleiman Omran	2006	2007
4		Majid Farag	2007	2009

== See also ==
- Palestinian National Security Forces

Other military intelligence agencies

- Defence Intelligence Agency (India)
- Strategic Intelligence Agency (Indonesia)
- Glavnoye Razvedyvatel'noye Upravleniye (GRU – Russian Military Intelligence)
- Defence Intelligence and the Intelligence Corps (UK)
- Direction du Renseignement Militaire (France)
- Defense Intelligence Agency (US)
