= Zanana =

Arabic slang term

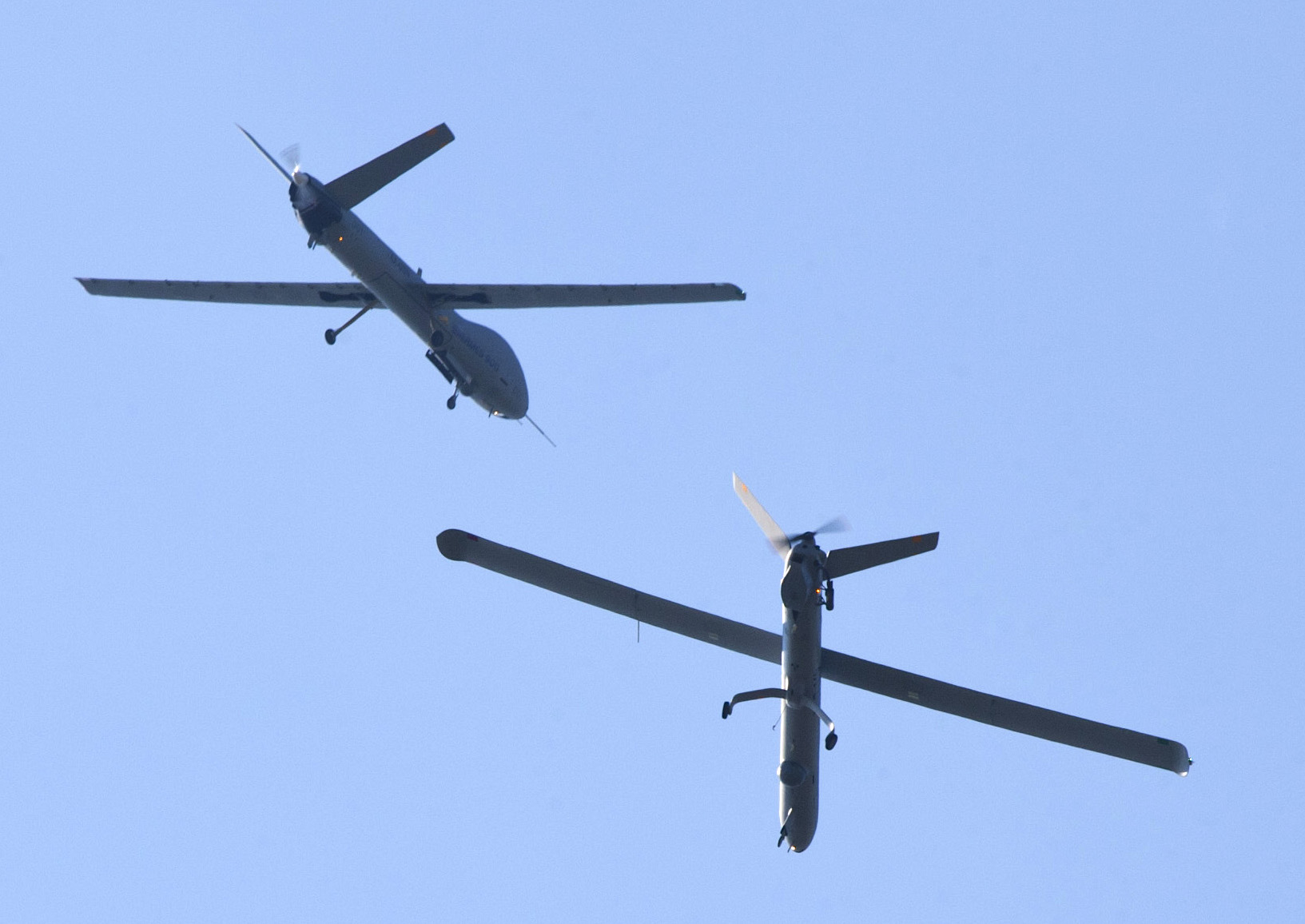
Israeli Elbit Systems drones in flight at low altitude

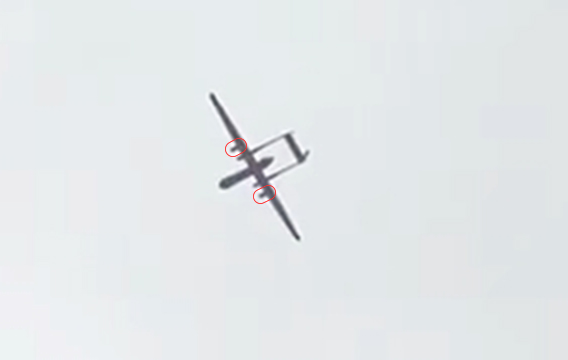
Devices used on a IAI Heron

Zanana (Arabic: زنانة, romanized: zanāna) is an Arabic slang term used by Palestinians in the Gaza Strip. The word means "buzzing sound" and it is used to refer to the noise produced by Israeli drones in the sky over Gaza, as well as to the drones themselves.

== Background ==
The Gaza Strip was occupied by Israel in the 1967 Six-Day War, and placed under Israeli military administration. The 1993 Oslo Accords altered the deployment of Israeli troops in Gaza, with the new Palestinian Authority holding police power, but Israel retained control of the borders, major roads, and Israeli settlements and surrounding areas. The Second Intifada beginning in 2000 led to stricter Israeli restrictions on Palestinians in Gaza. In 2005, Israel unilaterally disengaged from Gaza, evacuating settlers and army personnel. However, Israel subsequently continued to send its military into Gaza at its own discretion, and retained practical control of Gaza's borders, airspace, and territorial waters. In 2007, following Hamas's election into power in Gaza, Israel imposed an indefinite blockade on Gaza, restricting the movement of people and goods including food supply and infrastructure.

"We're looking at how you control a city or a territory from the air when it's no longer legitimate to hold or occupy that territory on the ground."

— Head of the Israeli Air Force in 2004

Israel is a leading manufacturer and exporter of drones, and uses drones extensively in its military operations. Israeli drones were first developed in the 1980s for surveillance purposes during the Israeli occupation of Southern Lebanon. Since 2000, Israeli drones have commonly been present in the sky over the Gaza Strip, where they were initially used for surveillance; missile strikes targeting people and infrastructure first occurred in 2004 and proliferated in 2006 after Israel's unilateral disengagement. According to Israel Defense Forces data, drones flew 6,000 hours in Gaza airspace during the 11-day 2021 Israel–Palestine crisis; 4,000 flight hours per month is a typical statistic in Gaza. In addition to surveilling and killing both militants and civilians, with a majority of those killed being civilians, the drones produce a near-constant buzzing noise audible from the ground, disrupt satellite television reception, and create a psychological impact involving fear among the Palestinian population in Gaza. Increases in volume generate fear of military escalation, and the consistent buzzing is disruptive to sleep.

== Meaning and use ==
"For us, drones mean death. When you hear drones, you hear death."

— Hamdi Shaqqura, a deputy director of the Palestinian Center for Human Rights

A rough literal translation of the Arabic word zanana (also transliterated zenana) is "buzzing sound" or "noisemaker". In Egypt, which borders Gaza and has influenced its culture, zenana is a slang term that refers to a nagging wife. The term was adopted by Palestinians in the Gaza Strip to refer to the buzzing noise produced by Israeli drones, which is audible from the ground and at times disrupts the sleep of people in Gaza. Through synecdoche, the term is also used to refer to the drones themselves. It has also been used by Palestinians in Gaza to refer to internal informants who provide information to Hamas or the Palestinian Authority.

Residents of Gaza frequently complain about the zanana on social media, referring both to the sound produced by the drones and the presence of the drones themselves. It has also been mentioned in various works of literature by Palestinians in Gaza.
