= Nasser Al-Burini =

Palestinian military officer (born 1979)

Nasser Mousa Tawfiq Omran (Al-Burini)
- Born: 26 March 1979 (age 46) Nablus, Palestine
- Allegiance: State of Palestine
- Branch: Palestinian Authority Security Forces
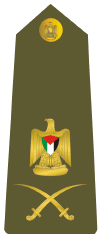
- Rank: Major General
- Commands: Director of the Palestinian Military Liaison

Nasser Mousa Tawfiq Omran (Al-Burini) (born 26 March 1979) is a Palestinian Major General. He currently serves as the Director of the Palestinian Military Liaison and also holds the position of Chairman of the Joint Security Committee since 17 November 2024.

== Education ==
Al-Burini holds a Bachelor's degree from Al-Quds Open University and a Master's degree in Leadership and Strategic Planning. He has completed numerous specialized training courses that enhanced his expertise and skills in various fields. These include commando and parachuting courses, counterterrorism training, crisis management and negotiation courses in Egypt, as well as trainer preparation and advanced personal protection courses in Russia. Additionally, he received training in strategic and tactical operations in collaboration with Canadian instructors and participated in several courses on political guidance.

== Career ==
Al-Burini joined the Palestinian Presidential Guard and began working with Yasser Arafat on 1 January 1997. He also accompanied President Mahmoud Abbas for many years. On 13 April 2019, he was appointed Director General of Cabinet Security and served as the Special Security Assistant to former Prime Minister Mohammad Shtayyeh.

On 17 November 2024, he was appointed Director General of the Palestinian Military Liaison.
