= Palestinian National Security Forces =

PNA paramilitary security forces

- قوات الأمن الوطني الفلسطيني
- NSF Emblem
- Founded: 1994
- Service branches: General Security; Air Police; Naval Police; Military Liaison; Military Intelligence

Leadership
- Commander: Major General Al-Abd Ibrahim Khalil

Related articles
- Ranks: Military ranks of Palestine

The Palestinian National Security Forces (NSF; Arabic: قوات الأمن الوطني الفلسطيني, romanized: Quwwat al-Amn al-Watani al-Filastini) are the paramilitary security forces of the State of Palestine. The name may either refer to all National Security Forces, including some special services but not including the Interior Security Forces, the Presidential Guard and General Intelligence, or refer to the main force within the National Security Forces. Since the signing of the Oslo Accords, these forces operate in areas controlled by the Palestinian National Authority. In 2003, the organizations were merged into the Palestinian Security Services.

The Palestinian National Security Forces engage in various activities, including general law enforcement. A rough estimate of the total strength as of 2007 is 42,000 troops. As the Israeli–Palestinian conflict goes on, the security forces notably co-operate with other law enforcement agencies, such as arresting militant sub-groups and assisting the Israeli government with prosecuting those picked up. According to The Jerusalem Post, "In the past, Palestinian security forces have released arrested terrorists and then quietly tipped off Israel to mitigate internal public criticism against handing over Palestinians to Israel."

== Background ==
As part of the Oslo Accords, the Palestinian National Authority (PNA) was authorized to recruit and train a police force with paramilitary capabilities, but was not permitted to have a military force. Several bilateral agreements between the PNA and Israel regulate the size of the force, its structure, armament, and composition. The agreements provide Israel with the right to review potential recruits and withhold approval of those with a terrorist background. They were not enforced, however, with the result that the actual size and equipment of the force in 2002 exceeded what was permitted.

Initially, Yasser Arafat set up a string of 14 overlapping and often competing security forces, each one controlled by a rival political or former guerrilla chieftain, but all of them ultimately loyal to him and his Fatah party. After Hamas had established a PNA government in March 2006, it formed its own security service, the Executive Force, headed by Jamal Abu Samhadana, who was killed by Israel three months later.

== Tasks ==
The National Security Forces engage in various activities, including general law enforcement. The Military Intelligence collects external military intelligence. It became the NSF Military Intelligence Department. The Military Police is a separate unit. The Military Liaison coordinates security with Israel and participated in joint Israeli–Palestinian patrols in the past. The Naval Police is tasked to protect the territorial waters of Gaza.

== History ==
=== Early history ===
The predecessor of the NSF was the PLO's Palestine Liberation Army. When the NSF were formed, most personnel was recruited from the PLA. Gradually, local recruits were added. From the late 1990s, the CIA played the central role in building up PA security forces, in close co-operation with the Israeli military and intelligence. After the killing of three US officials in the Gaza Strip in 2003, British forces played an increasingly active role.

=== Second Intifada ===
The Palestinian Preventive Security Force played a significant role during the Al-Aqsa Intifada. It participated in major operations such as Operation Defensive Shield. They also took part in battles such as the Battle of Jenin and the Siege of the Church of the Nativity in Bethlehem.

=== 2005 restructuring plan ===
According to The Guardian, based on the Palestine Papers, in 2003, British Prime Minister Tony Blair approved a plan of the Secret Intelligence Service MI6 for a US-led "counter-insurgency surge" against Hamas. MI6 proposed a secret plan to crush Hamas and other armed groups on the West Bank. It included internment of leaders and activists, closure of radio stations and replacement of imams in mosques. The plan recommended inter alia: "Degrading the capabilities of the rejectionists – Hamas, PIJ [Palestinian Islamic Jihad] and the [Fatah-linked] Al Aqsa Brigades – through the disruption of their leaderships' communications and command and control capabilities; the detention of key middle-ranking officers; and the confiscation of their arsenals and financial resources". Also the internment of leading Hamas and PIJ figures should have been explored. The plan aimed to implement the Road map for peace.

In March 2005, a secret British "Palestinian Security Plan" was presented with detailed proposals for a new security taskforce, based on "trusted PA contacts" outside the control of "traditional security chiefs", a British/US security "verification team", and "direct lines" to Israeli intelligence. The document notes that Israel was not content with the functioning of the NSF and opposed enhancement of the organisation with munitions and surveillance equipment. In a "subtle approach", the “old guard” could be retired with honour, "with subtle timing, once the decisions are made and the new structures are emerging" ... "The Israeli occupation has totally destroyed the capability of the NSF itself [in the West Bank] and inflicted significant damage on its infrastructure. NSF personnel are not permitted to bear arms or to move between areas in uniforms ... The NSF, being unarmed, are in no position to confront the militants."

On 2 April 2005, President Abbas dismissed West Bank national security chief General Haj Ismail Jaber. The reason given was a shooting incident on 30 March inside Abbas’ headquarters in which militants fired into the air. Abbas also fired Ramallah security chief Yunis al-Has. Abbas placed the security services in Ramallah on a “state of alert”. A large-scale reform of the security services followed that month. On 22 April, head of the Gaza Security Forces Moussa Arafat was replaced by Suleiman Heles.

=== 2007 Fatah–Hamas conflict ===
During the year 2007, Fatah and Hamas, two of the main political parties in Palestine, were having confrontations in Gaza. As part of the Fatah–Hamas conflict, Fatah deployed the Palestinian Security Forces to confront the Hamas paramilitary forces in Northern Gaza. The confrontation led to the collapse of the Preventive Security Forces headquarters. The surprising Hamas victory led to the withdrawal of Fatah forces from Gaza.

=== 2014 Italian–Palestinian training programme ===
By virtue of a bilateral agreement signed between the Italian Ministry of Defence and Ministry of Interior of the Palestinian Authority, the Carabinieri became a partner in the technical and professional training of Palestinian security forces and, for this reason, on 19 March 2014, Carabinieri instructors left Italy for Jericho, where is situated the General Training Centre.

=== 2022–present conflict with militias ===
PA security forces have clashed with local Palestinian militias in the West Bank, seen as the common enemy of both the PA and Israel. Cooperation between the PA security forces and the IDF is reflected by the fact that the former have simply remained in their barracks during IDF raids, and have actively interfered with militants' defenses against those raids. During the Gaza war, the rate of clashes has increased. The July 2024 West Bank unrest directed against the Palestinian Authority was a major escalation in the conflict, sparked by the alleged arrest attempt of "Abu Shujaa", the leader of the Tulkarm Brigade, on 26 July. The PA also launched notable operations into Tubas in October 2024 and into Jenin in December 2024.

== Commanders ==
- Abdul Razzaq Majida (1994–2007)
- Dhiyab Al-Ali (2007–2011)
- Nidal Abu Dukhan (27 December 2011 – 1 March 2025)
- Al-Abd Ibrahim Khalil (1 March 2025 – present)

== Equipment ==
=== Personal Gear ===
- Personnel Armor System for Ground Troops
- SPECTRA helmet
- Enhanced Combat Helmet

=== Small Arms ===
- Zastava M70 (pistol)
- CZ 82
- Beretta 92
- Zastava CZ99
- Heckler & Koch MP5
- AKM
- Zastava M70 assault rifle
- Zastava M92
- M16 rifle
- M4 carbine
- FN MAG
- PK machine gun
- M1919 Browning machine gun

=== Vehicles ===
- Ford F150
- Toyota Hilux
- Land Rover Defender
- Volkswagen Caravelle

== Incidents ==
- During the Battle of Gaza, Hamas militants seized several Fatah members and threw one of them, Mohammed Sweirki, an officer in the elite Palestinian Presidential Guard, off the top of the tallest building in Gaza, a 15-story apartment building. In retaliation, Fatah militants attacked and killed the imam of the city's Great Mosque, Mohammed al-Rifati. They also opened fire on the home of Prime Minister Ismail Haniyeh. Just before midnight, a Hamas militant was thrown off a 12-story building.
- On 20 March 2015, two Palestinian children, Rakiz Abu Assab (10) and Mohammad Raed al-Hajj (11) were shot by Palestinian security forces near the Balata Refugee Camp, when the latter intervened against youths throwing stones. The former was shot in the stomach, the latter in the foot.

== Divisions in 1995 ==
Before the 2003–2005 reforms, numerous separate security forces, all under exclusive control of President Arafat, existed. The following list of forces (including Intelligence and Civil Police) was published, based on an interview with Gaza Police Commander Nasir Yusuf in early 1995:

1. National Security ("al-Aman al-Watani")
2. Navy ("al-Bahariya")
3. Information Bureau ("al-Astakhabarat")
4. Military Police ("al-Shurta al-'Askariyit")
5. Force 17 ("Kuwat Sabatash")
6. Intelligence ("al-Mukhabarat")
7. Civil Defence ("al-Dufaa'a al-Madeni")
8. Civil Police ("al-Shurta al-Madeniya")
9. Criminal Security (al-Aman al-Junaa'i")
10. Drugs ("al-Sha'bat Mkafahat al-Makhdarat")
11. Riot Police ("Makafa't al-Shaghab")
12. Traffic Police ("al-Shurta al-Marour")
13. Preventative Security ('al-Aman al-Waqa'i")
14. Military Discipline ("al-Anthabama al-'Askari")
15. Presidential Security ("al-Aman al-Ra'isi")

== See also ==
- Palestinian Security Services
- Palestinian Presidential Guard
- Palestinian Civil Police Force
- Palestinian Preventive Security
- Palestinian General Intelligence Service
- Palestinian Military Intelligence Service
- Ministry of Interior of Palestine
- United States security assistance to the Palestinian National Authority
- Palestine Liberation Army
