= Military ranks of Palestine =

Military ranks are used by the Palestinian National Security Forces. Due to historical connections, the design of the insignia are similar to Britain and other republican Arab countries like Syria, Egypt, and Iraq.

== Ranks ==
Commissioned Officers

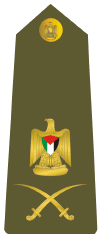
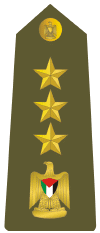
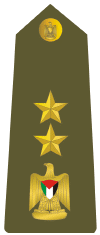
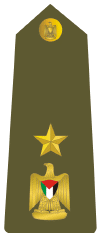
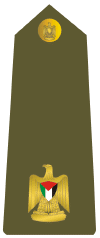
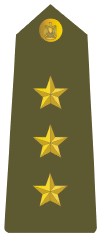
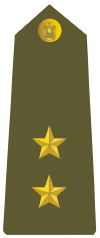
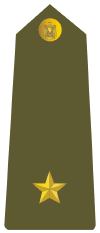
| Rank group | General / flag officers | | Senior officers | | | Junior officers |
|---|---|---|---|---|---|---|---|---|
| Palestinian National Security Forces |
| Palestinian National Security Forces | لواء 'Malaz | عميد; Eamid | عقيد; Eaqid | مقدم; Muqaddam | رائد; Rayid | نقيب; Naqib | ملازم أول; Mulazim awwal | ملازم; Mulazim |

Enlisted

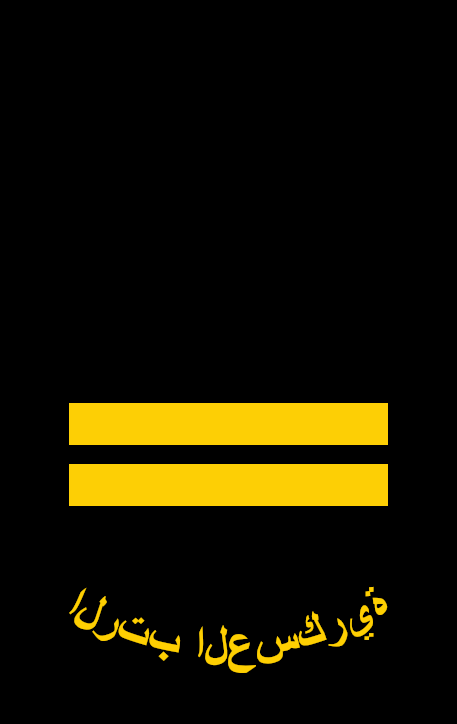
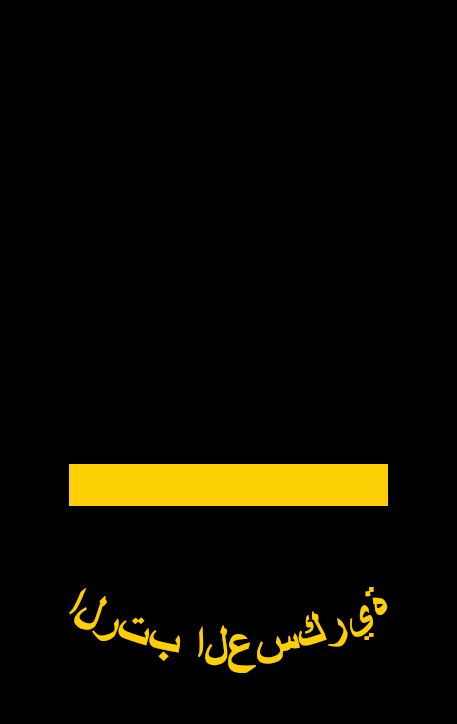
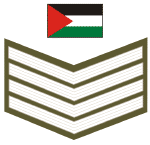
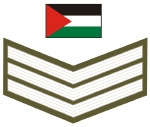
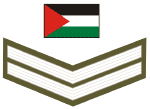
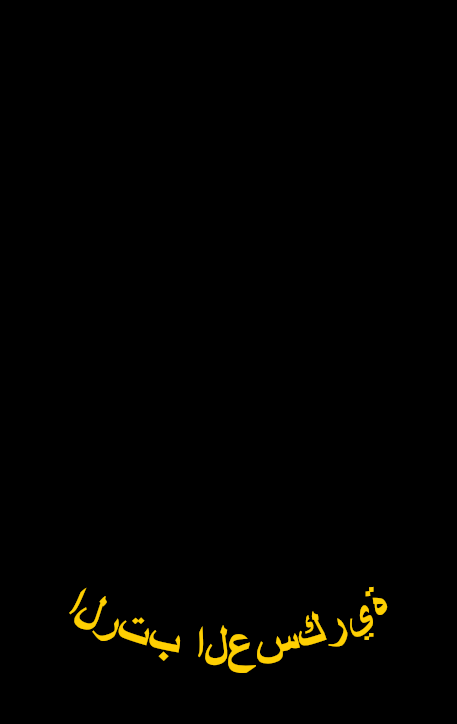
| Rank group | Senior NCOs | | | | Junior NCOs | Enlisted |
|---|---|---|---|---|---|---|
| Palestinian National Security Forces |
| Palestinian National Security Forces | مساعد أول; Musaeid 'awal | مساعد; Musaeid | رقيب أول; Raqib 'awal | رقيب; Raqib | عريف; Earif | جندي; Jundiun |

== See also ==
- Palestinian National Security Forces
