= Palestinian Military Liaison =

Security apparatus in Palestine

- جهاز الارتباط العسكري

Agency overview
- Formed: 1994
- Headquarters: Ramallah, Palestine
- Agency executive: Major General, Nasser Al-Burini
- Parent agency: Palestinian Security Services

The Palestinian Military Liaison (PML; Arabic: جهاز الارتباط العسكري) is a security agency under the Palestinian National Authority. It was established to coordinate field, security, and civil affairs with the Israeli side on various issues related to movement, mobility, security, and humanitarian operations.

The agency also facilitates the work of official Palestinian institutions in areas under security coordination. It is part of the broader Palestinian security apparatus and plays a central role in following up on citizens’ daily matters, including checkpoints, permits, transferring patients, and the entry of humanitarian aid.

It operates within the framework of civil and security coordination agreements signed between the Palestine Liberation Organization (PLO) and Israel.
