= Palestinian Naval Police =

Naval service branch of the Palestinian National Security Forces

- الشرطة البحرية
- Emblem of the Palestinian Naval Police
- Founded: 1994; 32 years ago
- Country: Palestine
- Type: Coast guard
- Part of: Palestinian National Security Forces
- Garrison/HQ: Gaza City, Palestine

The jurisdiction of the Palestinian Naval Police is restricted to 6 nautical miles off the coast of the Gaza Strip of Palestine

The Palestinian Naval Police, also known as the Palestinian Navy and the Gaza Marine (English: Gazan Navy), is the naval branch of the Palestinian National Security Forces (PNSF) whose task includes securing the Mediterranean Sea coastline of the Gaza Strip of Palestine. The Naval Police was established in the Gaza–Jericho Agreement signed on 4 May 1994. Under the Oslo II Accord, its activities are restricted to 6 nautical miles from the coast.

Analysis on independent Palestinian sea operations are usually discussed within the context of final status agreements during peace negotiations with Israel. Since the declaration of the State of Palestine, most sources that mention the term refer to only the coastal regions along the Gaza Strip.

== History ==
The Gaza–Jericho Agreement stipulated a partial withdrawal of the Israel Defense Forces from the Gaza Strip and West Bank, providing the two areas with limited Palestinian self-rule for five years under the newly established Palestinian Authority. The Palestinian Authority was invested with legislative, executive, judicial and policing powers to maintain order and security. Details of the security arrangements along the Mediterranean coast of the Gaza Strip are set out in Article XI of Annex I of the agreement. It was also agreed to establish a center for coordination and maritime cooperation between the two sides.

The headquarters of the Naval Police is located in the Port of Gaza. In January 2002, the Israeli commando unit Shayetet 13 raided the port, sank two patrol boats and destroyed the headquarters and its warehouses after Naval Police commanders were implicated in the Karine A affair, an attempt to secretly bring in 50 tons of weapons by boat into Gaza.

== See also ==
- Palestinian National Security Forces
- Royal Jordanian Navy
