= Battle of Gaza (2007) =

Hamas takeover of the Gaza Strip from Fatah

Coordinates: 31°31′N 34°27′E

- Part of the Fatah–Hamas conflict and Palestinian internal political violence
- Map of the Gaza Strip
Date	7–15 June 2007
Location	Gaza Strip, Palestine: With spillovers to the West Bank
Result	Hamas victory
Territorial changes	Hamas takeover of the Gaza Strip; Hamas expels the Fatah government and forms new one in the Gaza Strip

Belligerents
Hamas government (Note: From June 11); Hamas; Palestinian Islamic Jihad; (Fatah) Al-Aqsa Martyrs' Brigades	Palestinian Authority; Fatah; Israel

Commanders and leaders
(Hamas) Ismail Haniyeh (Hamas) Khaled Mashal	(Fatah) Mahmoud Abbas (Fatah) Mohammed Dahlan (Fatah) Mohammed Sweirki †

Units involved
Hamas; (Hamas) Al-Qassam Brigades; Executive Force; (Palestinian Islamic Jihad) Al-Quds Brigades; (Fatah) Al-Aqsa Martyrs' Brigades	Fatah; Al-Aqsa Martyrs' Brigades; Palestinian Security Services; Palestinian National Security Forces; Palestinian Preventive Security; Palestinian General Intelligence Service; Palestinian Presidential Guard; Israel Defense Forces; Israeli Air Force

Strength
(Hamas) Al-Qassam Brigades: 15,000; Executive Police Force: 6,000; Total: ~21,000	Al-Aqsa Martyrs' Brigades: 3,500+ (surrendered); National Security: 30,000; Preventive Security: 30,000; General Intelligence: 5,000; Presidential Guard: 4,200; Total: 72,700+

Casualties and losses
- At least 161 killed (120 combatants, 39 civilians, 2 UNRWA personnel); 700+ injured

The Battle of Gaza, also known as the Gaza Civil War, was a brief civil war between Fatah and Hamas that took place in the Gaza Strip from 7 to 15 June 2007. It was a prominent event in the Fatah–Hamas conflict, centered on the struggle for power after the fall of the National Unity Government between Hamas and Fatah, which was dissolved shortly afterwards. This led to the de facto division of the Palestinian territories into two entities: the West Bank governed by the Palestinian National Authority (PNA), and the Gaza Strip governed by Hamas. Hamas fighters took control of the Gaza Strip, while Fatah officials were either taken as prisoners, executed, or expelled. The Palestinian Centre for Human Rights reported that at least 161 people were killed and more than 700 were wounded during the fighting.

== Background ==
=== Events leading up to the 2006 Palestinian legislative election ===
In 2003, the Palestinian Basic Law of the PNA was amended and a semi-presidential form of government was established, whereby a constitution creates a directly elected fixed-term president, plus a prime minister and cabinet collectively responsible to the legislature.

Documents published in the Palestine Papers reveal that in 2004, the British Secret Intelligence Service helped to draw up a security plan for the Fatah-led PNA. The plan proposed a number of ways to degrade the capabilities of opposition groups such as Hamas, Palestinian Islamic Jihad (PIJ), and Al-Aqsa Brigades. The strategy would involve disruption of command, control, and communications capabilities, detention of key officials, and confiscation of their weapons and financial resources. This plan was passed to Jibril Rajoub, a senior Fatah official of the PNA, and most of the stated objectives were achieved by the West Bank-based PNA security apparatus.

Yasser Arafat, the President of the Palestinian National Authority, died on 11 November 2004. A Palestinian presidential election to fill the position took place on 9 January 2005 in both the West Bank and Gaza. This election—which was boycotted by both Hamas and PIJ—resulted in Palestine Liberation Organization (PLO) and Fatah chairman Mahmoud Abbas being elected president for a four-year term.

On 8 February 2005, Palestinian President Mahmoud Abbas and Israeli Prime Minister Ariel Sharon announced a ceasefire, which Hamas endorsed on 17 March 2005. On 19 March 2005, twelve Palestinian factions—including Fatah, Hamas, PIJ, the Popular Front for the Liberation of Palestine (PFLP), and the Democratic Front for the Liberation of Palestine (DFLP)—signed the Palestinian Cairo Declaration, which reaffirmed the status of the PLO as the sole legitimate representative of the Palestinian people, and implied a reform of the PLO by its inclusion of Hamas and PIJ.

Israel completed its unilateral disengagement from the Gaza Strip on 12 September 2005, removing all Israeli residents and security personnel, and demolishing all of the associated residential buildings. On 26 September 2005, Israeli forces arrested or detained 450 members of Hamas for violating the ban on rallies, public meetings, and election campaigns inside Jerusalem. Most of those Hamas members were either running for office or actively campaigning for candidates in the 2006 Palestinian legislative election.

=== 2006 Palestinian legislative election ===
The 2006 Palestinian legislative election took place on 25 January 2006 and was assessed by international observers as free and fair. It resulted in a Hamas victory, surprising Israel and the United States, which had expected Fatah to retain power. On 27 January, US President George Bush said "the landslide victory of the militant Islamic group Hamas was a rejection of the 'status quo' and a repudiation of the 'old guard' that had failed to provide honest government and services".

On 30 January 2006, the Quartet on the Middle East (United States, Russia, United Nations, and European Union) issued a formal statement congratulating the Palestinian people. In the statement, the Quartet stipulated that "future assistance to any new Government would be reviewed by donors against that Government's commitment to the principles of non-violence, recognition of Israel, and acceptance of previous agreements and obligations, including the Road Map." Hamas rejected these conditions, saying that "the 'unfair conditions' would endanger the well-being of Palestinians". This view was echoed by Saudi Foreign Minister Saud al-Faisal, who said: "The European Union insisted on having elections in Palestine, and this is the result of what they asked for. Now to come around, and say [they] don't accept the will of the people that was expressed through democratic means, seems an unreasonable position to take." The BBC's diplomatic correspondent, James Robbins, said the Quartet's response was chosen with care: "They did not demand a renunciation of violence or immediate recognition of Israel, but a commitment to these things in the future".

=== First Haniyeh Government ===
After Hamas rejected the conditions of the Quartet, Fatah and other factions refused to join in a national unity government. On 29 March 2006, Hamas established the First Haniyeh Government, which was composed mostly of members of Hamas, with Hamas leader Ismail Haniyeh as Prime Minister. The international community responded by imposing economic sanctions against the PNA, and Egypt and Israel largely closed their border crossings with Gaza, instituting a blockade of the Gaza Strip.

President Abbas was under pressure from the international community, which considered Hamas's victory to be unacceptable, as it was perceived to undermine decades of international efforts to secure a peaceful resolution to the conflict. The Quartet attempted to undermine Hamas and force it from power, while strengthening the position of Abbas. It was suggested that Abbas could use his constitutional powers to dismiss the government and call for new elections, which would be intended to yield a different result and reinstall Fatah in power on the grounds that the Palestinian electorate would perceive Hamas as a failure. The threat of new elections was never carried out because it emerged that Hamas might in fact be returned to power despite its inability to implement its manifesto, and because the movement itself strongly signaled that calling new elections, although a constitutional prerogative of the President, would amount to "a coup against Palestinian legitimacy and the will of the Palestinian people".

The new Hamas government clashed with President Abbas, who had to share power with it based on the Palestinian National Covenant. Through presidential decrees, Abbas extended exclusive presidential authority concerning administrative actions and periodically threatened to dismiss the Haniya government. He also placed the security forces of the Gaza Strip under his direct control and increased the Palestinian Presidential Guard—which consisted entirely of Fatah activists loyal to him—from about 90 to 1,000 officers. Hamas responded by creating a parallel security force—the Executive Force—which consisted of members of its military wing, led by Jamal Abu Samhadana. Abbas denounced the move as unconstitutional, saying that only the Palestinian president could command armed forces. The two forces refused to cooperate—Hamas's forces supported armed resistance against Israel, whereas those of Fatah were committed to upholding the Oslo Accords.

Hamas was receiving money and arms from Iran, and possibly Syria, and was threatening to increase its Executive Force to 6,000 men. At that point, the U.S. began to provide training in urban anti-terrorist techniques to members of the Presidential Guard, with the goal of strengthening Abbas's security forces. Egypt, Jordan, and Turkey also began to provide similar training for the Fatah forces, and Britain, Spain, and the European Union began to provide communications equipment, vehicles, and logistical support. There was also a plan to add the PLO's Jordan-based Badr Brigade to the Presidential Guard. Israel's Security Agency also supported President Abbas and the Presidential Guard but was concerned from their previous experience, where many Palestinian security officers who had been trained by the CIA later engaged in attacks on Israeli targets or joined the al-Aqsa Brigades during the Second Intifada.

Following the abduction by Hamas militants of Gilad Shalit on 25 June 2006 in a cross-border raid via a tunnel out of Gaza, Israel arrested 49 senior Hamas officials, including 33 parliamentarians, nearly a quarter of PLC members and ministers on the West Bank. They also intensified the boycott of Gaza and took other punitive measures.

=== Second Haniyeh Government ===
President Abbas and the Fatah-dominated PLO developed a plan to replace the Hamas government with one acceptable to Israel and the international community. According to the plan, unveiled in Al Jazeera's Palestine Papers, a national unity government would be formed by mid-2007. If this new government failed to meet the Quartet's conditions, Abbas would dismiss the government and form an emergency government or call early elections.

By October 2006, the United States, Israel, many Arab governments, and most of Abbas's key advisors still held the view that if Hamas did not unambiguously accept the Quartet's conditions, it should be forced out of power. In December 2006, President Abbas called for new parliamentary and presidential elections, which members of both Hamas and Fatah rejected.

The Fatah and Hamas factions finally signed an agreement to stop their military confrontations on 8 February 2007 and agreed to form a national unity government. That government was established in March 2007.

== Battle ==
According to the International Institute for Strategic Studies, the June 2007 escalation was triggered by Hamas's conviction that the Palestinian Presidential Guard—expanded by the United States to 3,500 men and loyal to Mahmoud Abbas—was being positioned to take control of Gaza.

On 10 June 2007, the Fatah–Hamas conflict culminated in clashes between Fatah-allied forces and Hamas-allied forces. The primary Fatah forces were the Palestinian National Security Forces, particularly the Presidential Guard. The main force of Hamas was the Executive Force. Hamas militants seized several Fatah members and threw one of them, Mohammed Sweirki, an officer in the Presidential Guard, off the top of the tallest building in Gaza, a 15-story apartment building. In retaliation, Fatah militants attacked and killed the Imam of the city's Great Mosque, Mohammed al-Rifati. They also opened fire on the home of Prime Minister Ismail Haniyeh. Just before midnight, a Hamas militant was thrown off a 12-story building.

On 11 June, gunmen opened fire on the Palestinian cabinet building while the government was meeting inside. Fatah gunmen fired shots at the residence of Prime Minister Ismail Haniya, of Hamas, in Gaza City, but no casualties were reported.

On 12 June, Hamas began attacking posts held by their Fatah rivals. Hundreds of Hamas fighters had moved on the positions after giving their occupants two hours to leave. A major Fatah base in the northern town of Jabalia fell to Hamas fighters, witnesses told AFP news agency. Heavy fighting also raged around the main Fatah headquarters in Gaza City, with Hamas militants attacking with rocket-propelled grenades and automatic weapons.

On 13 June, Hamas attacked the headquarters of the Palestinian National Security Forces in northern Gaza. Gunmen fought for control of high-rise buildings serving as sniper positions, and Hamas said it had bulldozed a Fatah outpost controlling Gaza's main north–south road. Also on that day, an explosion wrecked the Khan Yunis headquarters of the Fatah-linked Palestinian Preventive Security, killing five people.

On 14 June, President Abbas announced the dissolution of the unity government and declared a state of emergency as Hamas militants took over vehicles and weapons in the National Security headquarters compound—Abbas' residence. The gunmen who entered the compound held a prayer there and waved a flag on the building's rooftop. At least 10 people were killed. Hamas TV broadcast a display of weapons inside the building, as well as jeeps, mortar shells and bulletproof vests seized in the compound, which, according to Hamas, were smuggled to Fatah by Israel and the Americans in the past few months across the border with Egypt. Hamas also changed the name of the neighborhood where the building is located from "Tel al-Hawa" to "Tel al-Islam". On the afternoon of 14 June, the Associated Press reported an explosion that rocked Gaza City. According to Fatah officials, security forces withdrew from their post and blew it up in order to not let Hamas take it over. The security forces later repositioned to another location. Later on 14 June, Hamas also took control of the southern Gaza Strip city of Rafah, which lies near an already closed border crossing with Egypt that, a crossing that is monitored by Israeli, Palestinian, and European Union security forces. The EU staff had, at that time, already been relocated to the Israeli city of Ashkelon for safety reasons.

On 15 June, Hamas completed taking control of the Gaza Strip, seizing all PNA government institutions and replacing all PNA officials in Gaza with Hamas members.

== Alleged military coup ==
As a result of the battle, Hamas took complete control of Gaza. The pro-Fatah view is that it was a plain military coup by Hamas. The pro-Hamas view is that the US drew up a plan to arm Fatah cadres with the aim of forcefully removing Hamas from power in Gaza, and that Fatah fighters, led by commander Mohammed Dahlan with logistical support from the US Central Intelligence Agency, were planning to carry out a bloody coup against Hamas. Then, Hamas pre-emptively took control over Gaza.

In an April 2008 article in Vanity Fair magazine, the journalist David Rose published confidential documents, apparently originating from the US State Department, which would prove that the United States collaborated with the PNA and Israel to attempt the violent overthrow of Hamas in the Gaza Strip, and that Hamas pre-empted the coup. The documents suggest that a government with Hamas should meet the demands of the Middle East Quartet, otherwise President Mahmoud Abbas should declare a "state of emergency", which effectively would dissolve the current unity government, or the government should collapse by other means. Rose quotes former Vice President Dick Cheney's chief Middle East adviser David Wurmser, who accused the Bush administration of "engaging in a dirty war in an effort to provide a corrupt dictatorship [led by Abbas] with victory". Wurmser believes that Hamas had no intention of taking Gaza until Fatah forced its hand. "It looks to me that what happened wasn't so much a coup by Hamas but an attempted coup by Fatah that was pre-empted before it could happen."

According to Alastair Crooke, the then British Prime Minister Tony Blair decided in 2003 to tie UK and EU security policy in the West Bank and Gaza to a US-led counterinsurgency against Hamas. This led to an internal policy contradiction that pre-empted the EU from mounting any effective foreign policy on the "peace process" alternative to that of the US. At a political level, the EU "talked the talk" of reconciliation between Fatah and Hamas, Palestinian state-building, and democracy. At the practical level, the EU "walked the walk" of disruption, detention, seizing finances, and destroying the capabilities of one [Hamas] of the two factions and prevented the parliament from exercising any control.

According to Crooke, the Quartet conditions for engagement with Hamas were developed precisely in order to prevent Hamas from meeting them, rather than as guidelines intended to open the path for diplomatic solutions. Then, British and American intelligence services were preparing a "soft" coup to remove Hamas from power in Gaza.

== Violations of international law ==
These attacks by both Hamas and Fatah constitute brutal assaults on the most fundamental humanitarian principles. The murder of civilians not engaged in hostilities and the willful killing of captives are war crimes, pure and simple.

— Sarah Leah Whitson,
Middle East director for Human Rights Watch

Human Rights Watch accused both sides of violating international humanitarian law, in some instances amounting to war crimes. For example, Fatah and Hamas fighters targeted and killed people not involved in hostilities, and engaged in gun battles near and even inside hospitals. The accusations also included public executions of captives and political opponents, throwing prisoners off high-rise apartment buildings, and shooting from a jeep marked with press insignia.

During the fighting, many incidents of looting took place. A crowd took furniture, wall tiles, and personal belongings from the villa of the deceased Palestinian leader and founder of Fatah Yasser Arafat. The home of former Fatah commander Mohammed Dahlan was also looted, as was Abbas's seafront presidential compound.

More than 1,000 persons, mostly members of Fatah or the PNA, were illegally arrested or detained in the first months of Hamas rule. The Palestinian Centre for Human Rights and Amnesty International documented many instances of people being abducted and tortured by Hamas militants.

== Aftermath ==
=== Division of government ===
On 14 June 2007, Palestinian President Mahmoud Abbas reacted to the Hamas takeover by declaring a state of emergency. He dismissed the unity government led by Ismail Haniyeh, and by presidential decree installed Salam Fayyad as prime minister. Haniyeh refused to accept his dismissal, accusing Abbas of participating in a US-led plot to overthrow him. Experts in Palestinian law, and independent members of the PLC, have questioned the legitimacy of the Fayyad government. According to the Palestinian Basic Law, the President can dismiss the prime minister, but the dismissed government continues to function as a caretaker government until a new government is formed and receives a vote of confidence from an absolute majority of the Palestinian Legislative Council. The Hamas-majority PLC has never met to confirm the Fayyad government. President Abbas, by presidential decree in September 2007, changed the voting system for the PLC into a full proportional representation system, bypassing the dysfunctional PLC.

With the dissolution of the Hamas-led unity government, the territory controlled by the PNA was de facto divided into two entities: the Hamas-controlled government of the Gaza Strip, and the West Bank, governed by the PNA.

The international community recognized the emergency government. Within days, the US recognized the Fayyad government, and ended the 15-month economic and political boycott of the PNA, in a bid to bolster President Abbas and the new Fatah-led Fayyad government. The European Union similarly announced plans to resume direct aid to the Palestinians, while Israel released to Abbas Palestinian tax revenues that Israel had withheld since Hamas took control of the Palestinian Legislative Council. The Middle East Quartet reiterated their continued support of Abbas and resumed normal relations with the Fatah-led PNA. The secretary-general of the United Nations, Ban Ki-moon, urged international support for Abbas's efforts "to restore law and order". Israel and Egypt began a blockade of the Gaza Strip.

=== Religious consequences ===
Islam is the official religion of the Palestinian Authority, and there are no Palestinian laws that specifically protect the religious freedom of non-Muslims. After Hamas took complete control of the Gaza Strip, they declared the "end of secularism and heresy in the Gaza Strip". The PLO and some Palestinian media outlets suggested that Hamas intended to establish an Islamic emirate and that Hamas employed a combination of violence, authoritarian rule, and Islamic ideology to control the residents of Gaza. Hamas political chief Ismael Haniyeh denied these accusations. A Hamas spokesman in Gaza said that Hamas was imposing Islamic law in Gaza, but this was denied by exiled Hamas leader Khaled Mashal.

With roughly 35,000 Palestinian Christians in the West Bank, 12,500 in East Jerusalem, and 3,000 in Gaza, Christians represent about 1.3 percent of the Palestinian population. Two days after Hamas took control of the Gaza Strip, a school and convent belonging to the Gaza Strip's tiny Roman Catholic community were ransacked, looted, and burned. Fatah accused Hamas of being behind the attack but Hamas denied it.

An Islamist movement called Jihadia Salafiya began to enforce Islamic law in Gaza, including a ban on alcohol, internet cafes, pool halls, bars, and on women in public places without proper head coverings. Sheik Abu Saqer, the leader of Jihadia Salafiya, said that Christians could only continue to live in the Gaza Strip if they accepted Islamic law and that Christians in Gaza who engage in missionary activity would be dealt with harshly. He further stated: "I expect our Christian neighbors to understand the new Hamas rule means real changes. They must be ready for Islamic rule if they want to live in peace in Gaza." Dozens of attacks against Christian targets—including barbershops, music stores, and schools—soon followed. The only Christian bookstore in Gaza was attacked, and the owner murdered, on 7 October 2007. In February 2008, gunmen blew up the YMCA library in the Gaza Strip.

=== Weapons ===
Hamas captured thousands of small arms and eight armoured combat vehicles supplied by the United States, Egypt, and Jordan. According to Muhammad Abdel-El of the Hamas-allied Popular Resistance Committees, Hamas and its allies captured quantities of foreign intelligence, including CIA files. Abu Abdullah of Hamas's "military wing", the Al-Qassam Brigades, claimed that Hamas would make portions of the documents public, in an attempt to expose covert relations between the United States and "traitor" Arab countries.
