= Nizar AlHajj =

Senior Palestinian Security Officer

Nizar Saeed Sadiq al-Hajj
- Born: 7 November 1978 (age 48); Jalqamus, Jenin Governorate, Palestine
- Military career
- Allegiance: State of Palestine
- Branch: Palestinian Authority Security Forces
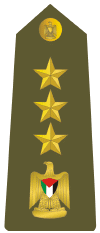
- Rank: Brigadier general
- Commands: Deputy Director-General of the Palestinian Preventive Security Service

Nizar Saeed Sadiq alHajj (born 7 November 1978) is a Palestinian security officer who has served as Deputy Director-General of the Palestinian Preventive Security Service since 5 May 2025.

== Early life and education ==
Nizar Saeed Sadiq al-Hajj was born on 7 November 1978 in the village of Jalqamus, in the Jenin Governorate, Palestine. He completed his secondary education before obtaining a bachelor's degree from the Naval Military College. He also attended several specialised training courses, particularly in the fields of intelligence and security.

Al-Hajj obtained a master's degree in Strategic Planning and Fundraising from the Arab American University. He also obtained a doctorate from the Faculty of Legal and Political Sciences at the University of Tunis El Manar.

== Career ==
Nizar al-Hajj joined the Palestinian Presidential Guard, beginning his career as an officer in the force. He accompanied Palestinian President Mahmoud Abbas for many years. Al-Hajj also served as senior security adviser to President Abbas and head of the Intelligence Department of the Presidential Guard.

On 5 May 2025, he assumed the position of Deputy Director-General of the Palestinian Preventive Security Service, following his appointment by presidential decree.
