= Palestinian Police =

Palestinian Police may refer to:

- Palestinian Civil Police Force, the police department responsible for civil law enforcement in areas under control of the Palestinian National Authority.
- Preventive Security Force, another security and intelligence apparatus of the Palestinian Security Services.
- Palestine Police Force, the British colonial police service established in the British Mandate for Palestine
