= Badr Brigade =

Badr Brigade may refer to:

- Badr Organization, in Iraq
- Badr Brigade in the Jordanian Army
- Badr Brigade, a Syrian rebel group affiliated with Jaysh al-Islam
