= 2008 breach of the Egypt–Gaza border =

Explosion set off by Hamas militants

Coordinates: 31°17′22.96″N 34°14′34.56″E

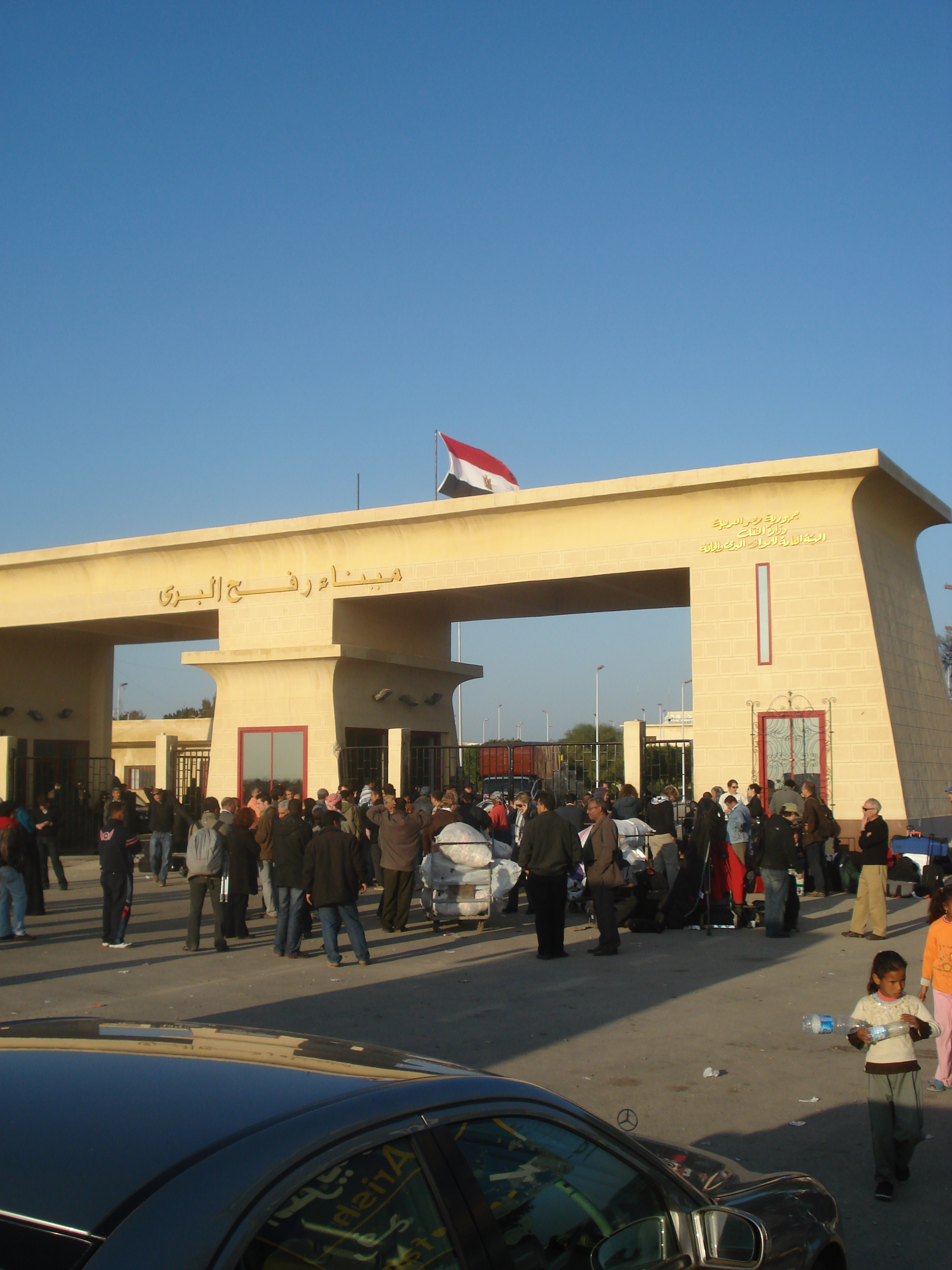
- Rafah Border Crossing
- Date: 23 January 2008
- Location: Rafah Border Crossing
- Type: Explosion
- Organized by: Hamas; (Hamas) Al-Qassam Brigades
- Outcome: 200,000–700,000 Palestinians crossed over to Egypt

On 23 January 2008, Hamas militants in the Gaza Strip set off an explosion near the Rafah border crossing, destroying part of the 2003 wall. The United Nations estimates that as many as half the 1.5 million population of the Gaza Strip crossed the border into Egypt seeking food and supplies. Due to fears that militants would acquire weapons in Egypt, Israeli police went on increased alert.

Egypt had closed the Rafah border crossing in June 2007, days before Hamas took control of Gaza at the end of the Gaza Civil War; The breach followed a blockade of the Gaza Strip by Israel beginning in part that same June, with fuel supply reductions in October 2007. A total blockade had begun on 17 January 2008 following a rise in rocket attacks on Israel emanating from Gaza.

Although Israel demanded Egypt reseal the border due to security concerns, Egyptian President Hosni Mubarak ordered his troops to allow crossings to alleviate the humanitarian crisis, while verifying that the Gazans did not attempt to bring weapons back into Gaza. In five days, Gazans spent some US$250 million in the North Sinai Governorate's capital of Arish alone. The sudden enormous demand there for staple products led to large local price rises and some shortages.

On 24 January, the United Nations Human Rights Council condemned Israel for the fifteenth time in less than two years, calling the blockade collective punishment. However, the proceedings were boycotted by Israel and the United States. On 27 January, Israeli Prime Minister Ehud Olmert promised that Israel would no longer disrupt the supply of food, medicine and necessary energy into the Gaza Strip. Meanwhile, President Mubarak announced plans to meet separately with representatives of Hamas and Fatah in order to come to a new border control agreement.

On 3 February, Gaza's Foreign minister, Mahmoud al-Zahar, announced that Hamas and Egypt would cooperate in controlling the border without Israeli control, "perhaps jointly with [Mahmoud] Abbas". Abbas' Palestinian National Authority said that Egypt had agreed to restore the 2005 border agreement giving Abbas control over the Rafah crossing, but excluding Hamas. Israel, on the other hand resisted Abbas' control of any crossing point. The border was closed—except to travelers returning home—eleven days after the breach.

== Background ==
After the 2005 Israeli disengagement, which ended their 38-year presence in Gaza, Egypt had pledged to help control their border with Gaza. U.S. Secretary of State Condoleezza Rice brokered a deal with Israel giving the Palestinian National Authority control over the Rafah Border crossing under the remote video observation of European Union and Israeli monitors.

After Hamas won the 2006 Palestinian legislative election in January 2006, an international diplomatic and financial boycott of the new Hamas-led government began. Beginning in June 2006, a series of battles erupted between Palestinian gunmen and the Israel Defense Forces (IDF) during 2006 Israel–Gaza conflict, which ended in a truce on 26 November.

In December 2006, Hamas began fighting to expel Fatah. Hundreds of rocket attacks on Israel from Gaza had continued despite the November truce. In March 2007, the Palestinian Legislative Council established a national unity government, with 83 representatives voting in favor and three against. Government ministers were sworn in by Mahmoud Abbas, the chairman on the Palestinian Authority, in a ceremony held simultaneously in Gaza and Ramallah. In June 2007, Hamas took control of the Gaza Strip and removed Fatah officials. Following the Battle of Gaza, the international sanctions were terminated in June 2007 while at the same time a new and more severe blockade of the Gaza Strip was initiated.

In response to the violent clashes, President Abbas declared a state of emergency and dissolved the national unity government on 14 June. Hamas gained complete control of the Gaza Strip on 15 June, after forcing out Fatah. The Israeli government closed all check-points along its border with Gaza in response to the violence. Egypt closed its border when fighting between Fatah and Hamas started on 7 June. The European Union monitors ended their oversight at the frontier on 14 June due to security concerns. Egyptian officials said that a decision to reopen Gaza's border would be made in consultation with the European Union and Israel. Hamas seized control of Gaza on 15 June.

== Humanitarian crisis ==
Beginning in June 2007, Israel limited its exports to Gaza to nine basic materials. Out of 9,000 commodities (including foodstuffs) that were entering Gaza before the 2006 elections, only 20 commodities were to be allowed in. In July 2007, Israeli officials planned to open the border crossing at Rafah to allow stranded Palestinians to return to Gaza but were deterred by Hamas's threats to open fire on the refugees.

In October 2007, Israel began limiting fuel supplies to the territory. Ongoing rocket attacks on Israeli civilian population centers, such as Sderot, prompted the Israeli government to declare the Gaza Strip a hostile entity in September 2007, enabling it to further limit exports to Gaza. Hamas responded that Israel had effectively declared war by labeling Gaza as an "enemy entity."

In December 2007, the International Committee of the Red Cross (ICRC) confirmed the need for humanitarian relief in the Palestinian territories. In a statement, the ICRC described the living conditions of Palestinians in the Gaza Strip as "alarming" and called for Israel to ease restrictions on the movement of goods into Gaza and the West Bank.

According to a United Nations study, by January 2008, the economic effects of the blockade had reached a critical threshold. Finally, on 17 January 2008, following a rise in the number of rocket attacks, Israel sealed the border completely.

On 20 January, the only power plant in Gaza shut down. The United Nations officials implored Israel to reverse its decision to seal all border crossings with the Gaza Strip, warning that the violence in the region and the lack of crucial supplies for 1.4 million Palestinians was provoking a humanitarian crisis. Israel accused Hamas of "fabricating" the power shortage, pointing out that the power plant in Gaza produces only a minority of the territory's power. Israel stated that the blackout occurred for media purposes and stated that Hamas had timed it themselves. Israel said it was still providing nearly 70 percent of the territory's power directly.

Following widespread international concern about an impending humanitarian crisis, and a warning from the United Nations that World Food Programme aid to about 860,000 Gazans could be halted within days because of the blockade, Israeli Defense Minister Ehud Barak decided to ease restrictions on the flow of goods into Gaza for a day on 22 January, permitting shipments of fuel for Gaza's power plant and cooking oil to enter Gaza.

== Breaching of wall ==
Gaza Strip. Rafah is at bottom-left.

On 22 January, gunfire erupted after a group of Hamas demonstrators, mostly women, forced open the door of the Rafah Border crossing and fled into Egypt.

Overnight on 23 January, gunmen set off a number of explosions along the wall near the crossing. Palestinians packed into cars and donkey carts, crossed the border into Egypt from Gaza on foot, to buy essential goods. Between 200,000 and 700,000 Palestinians crossed over to Egypt and bought items at shops at the Egyptian half of Rafah and the North Sinai Governorate's capital, Arish. A Palestinian security guard later told The Times of London that militants had been steadily cutting through the base of the Israeli Gaza Strip barrier with oxyacetylene torches for months.

While Egypt allowed Palestinians to enter Egypt, it did not let them travel very far; Palestinians were not allowed to travel further than Arish. Egypt said that it would not use force to send back Palestinians. Foreign ministry spokesman Hossam Zaki said the border would be closed again when all the Palestinians had returned.

Ahmed Yousef, a senior adviser to Gaza's Prime Minister Ismail Haniyeh, warned that "The next time there is a crisis in the Gaza Strip, Israel will have to face half a million Palestinians who will march toward Erez," a border crossing with Israel, and on to towns left during the 1948 Palestinian expulsion and flight. Israeli security officials said militants had exploited the breach in the border wall to send armed men into the Sinai to infiltrate Israel across the Sinai–Israel border. The officials said the militants were eager to hit back in response to Israeli attacks in recent weeks and predicted attacks from Sinai within the next two weeks.

On 25 January, Egyptian security forces blocked almost all illegal entry points along the border with Gaza to try to stem the flow of Palestinians wanting to leave. Egyptian forces in riot gear erected barbed wire and chain-link fences along the border to prevent more Palestinians from crossing. Palestinians attempted to break through, and several were injured in the resulting clashes.

After the repair, Palestinians used a bulldozer to knock over the new fence, creating an opening once more. As the border crossings entered their fifth day, Egyptian border police began stopping Gazans from entering in vehicles and blocked off the road beyond Rafah to Arish. In Rafah there was little left to buy, and it appeared Egypt had decided to restrict the resupply of goods to El Arish and Rafah in order to peacefully end the crossings and reestablish control over the border.

On 28 January, Egyptian security forces and Hamas militants strung barbed wire across one of the breaches, sealing it off. The Egyptians began repairing one of the two remaining breaches on 29 January.

== UN reaction ==
On 24 January, the United Nations Human Rights Council condemned Israel for the fifteenth time in less than two years. The Council released a statement calling on Israel to stop its military operations in Gaza and to open the Strip's borders to allow the entry of food, fuel and medicine. It asked the international community to ensure that Israel stop its actions in Gaza, which it referred to as "collective punishment of the Palestinian civilians that leads to disastrous humanitarian and environmental consequences."

An official resolution was presented by Syria and Pakistan on behalf of the Organisation of the Islamic Conference to the United Nations Security Council but could not be agreed upon. Thirty nations voted in favor of the resolution, one (Canada) voted against the resolution, 15 countries abstained, and one (Gabon) was absent. Both Israel and the United States boycotted the proceedings, which ended with a call for Israel to lift its siege of Gaza but made no mention of the Palestinian rocket attacks on communities in the western Negev.

== Israeli government response ==
Israel demanded Egypt reseal the border and launched air strikes against the Gazan half of Rafah overnight on 24 January, killing Mohammed Abu Harb, the commander of Hamas's military there.

At a court hearing on 27 January, the Israeli government promised to resume supplies of fuel, but not at normal levels, for another week. Later that day, Israeli Prime Minister Ehud Olmert promised that Israel would no longer disrupt the supply of food, medicine and necessary energy into the Gaza Strip. Israel then launched additional air strikes targeting the Gazan military in Rafah, but there were no injuries.

== Border-control talks ==
Ehud Olmert, the Israeli prime minister, and Mahmoud Abbas, President of the Palestinian National Authority which controls the West Bank, held talks on 27 January in Jerusalem on the border breach. Abbas reportedly wants to take over Gaza's border crossings, including the one with Egypt that Palestinians in Gaza breached, but Israel resisted the idea of giving the West Bank-based government control of the Gaza crossings, citing concerns about security.

Hamas and Fatah, who controlled Gaza before the last election, have accepted an invitation from Egypt to hold separate talks in Cairo on the border crisis. All sides hoped to create a plan to keep the border between Egypt and Gaza open. A Hamas delegation also met with Saudi Prince Saud al-Faisal who has acted as a mediator between Hamas and Fatah.

An Israeli defense delegation secretly visited Cairo on 28 January and discussed the situation with top Egyptian officials the London-based Asharq Alawsat newspaper reported. According to the report, the delegation relayed to Egypt Israel's fears that Palestinian militants would smuggle weapons and explosives through Egypt's open border with the Gaza Strip. The Egyptians stressed that Israel was the one responsible for the deterioration of the situation in the Gaza Strip and the eventual breaching of the border wall.

Hamas stated they would accept a return of the EU monitoring mission if it were to reside in Egypt or the Gaza Strip, as opposed to being based in Israel.

== Border closure ==
The border was closed by Egypt with Hamas's cooperation, except for travelers returning home, on 3 February.

== Economic effects ==
In Arish alone, Gazans spent some US$250 million over five days. Palestinians and Egyptians complained about soaring prices and shortages, especially of food. Enormous demand for staple products from Gaza caused rampant inflation, as did the Egyptian government's decision to restrict goods coming into the border region in an effort to encourage the Palestinians to go back home. Palestinians also accused Egyptians of price gouging, where prices have risen to the point where the cost of goods is sufficiently high that supply matches demand.

The breach created tens of thousands of temporary new jobs in Gaza where the returning caravans set up shop; unemployment had been at 40 percent. Egyptian merchants also crossed into the Gaza Strip to sell their wares. The food brought in from Egypt during the first six days would last Gazans three months, fuel about two days and cement for two weeks if the borders are resealed, according to various estimates from economists, business leaders and gas station owners.

However, were the border to remain open long term, Gaza's workers and manufacturers who had worked in the more upscale Israeli market before layoffs during the Second Intifada would have trouble competing in Egypt's low-wage economy, according to West Bank economist Nasser Abdel Karim.

== International response ==
Iran
Tehran offered to send aid to Egypt to alleviate the effects of the breach.

United States
U.S. President George W. Bush condemned Hamas for delivering "misery" to the Palestinian people, and called for talks to create a Palestinian state.

European Union
The EU said it would consider sending its monitors back to Gaza's border with Egypt, and unveiled a new plan for getting aid to Palestinians.

== See also ==
- Blockade of the Gaza Strip
- Israeli–Palestinian conflict
- Political status of the West Bank and Gaza Strip
- Gaza Strip under Hamas
