= International aid to Palestinians =

Aspect of the Arab–Israeli conflict

International aid has been provided to Palestinians since at least the 1948 Arab–Israeli War. The Palestinians view the aid as keeping the Israeli–Palestinian peace process going, while Israelis and other foreign policy authorities have raised concerns that it is used to fund terrorism and removes the imperative for Palestinians to negotiate a settlement of the Israeli–Palestinian conflict. As a provision of the Oslo Accords, international aid was to be provided to the Palestinians to ensure economic solvency for the Palestinian National Authority (PA). In 2004, it was reported that the PA, within the West Bank and Gaza Strip, receives one of the highest levels of aid in the world. In 2006, economic sanctions and other measures were taken by several countries against the PA, including suspension of international aid following Hamas' victory at the Palestinian Legislative Council election. Aid to the PA resumed in 2008 following the Annapolis Conference, where Hamas was not invited. Aid has been provided to the Palestinian Authority, Palestinian non-governmental organizations (PNGOs) as well as Palestinian political factions by various foreign governments, international organizations, international non-governmental organizations (INGOs), and charities, besides other sources.

The Ad Hoc Liaison Committee coordinates the delivery of most aid to Palestinians. The entities that provide such aid are categorized into seven groups: the Arab nations, the European Union, the United States, Japan, international institutions (including agencies of the UN system), European countries, and other nations. The United States has been a major donor, providing more than $5.2 billion through USAID since 1994.

The international community has sent billions of dollars in aid to the Gaza Strip to provide relief to the more than 2 million Palestinians living there. From 2014 to 2020, U.N. agencies spent nearly $4.5 billion in Gaza, including $600 million in 2020 alone. According to the Organization for Economic Cooperation and Development, aid to Palestinians totaled over $40 billion between 1994 and 2020.

Unlike the Palestine Liberation Organization (PLO) in the West Bank, Hamas is designated as a terrorist entity, so the United States and the EU do not provide any assistance to Hamas. Israel has allowed Qatar to give hundreds of millions of dollars in aid through Hamas, and Hamas has collected revenue for years by taxing imports. Iran provides around $100 million annually to Hamas and other Palestinian groups.

== History ==
=== Before Oslo Accords ===
Before the signing of the Oslo Accords, international aid for the West Bank and Gaza came mainly from Western and Arab states, mostly through UN agencies such as UNRWA. Most programs were started or developed during the 1970s, and expanded during the 1980s. Most of the aid was channeled through PNGOs or INGOs. Although the stance of the donors during the pre-Oslo period is regarded by some analysts, such as Rex Brynen, as controversial and linked with phenomena such as corruption, nationalism and factional rivalries, International aid effectively financed a series of programs in the sectors of agriculture, infrastructure, housing and education.

=== Oslo Accords ===
The Oslo Accords, officially signed on September 13, 1993, contained substantial provisions on economic matters and international aid: Annex IV of the Declaration of Principles (DoP) discusses regional cooperation and implicitly calls for major international aid efforts to help the Palestinians, Jordan, Israel and the entire region.

On October 1, 1993, the international donor community (nations and institutions) met in Washington to mobilize support for the peace process, and pledged to provide approximately $2.4 billion to the Palestinians over the course of the next five years. The international community's action was based on the premise that it was imperative to garner all financial resources needed to make the agreement successful, and with a full understanding that in order for the Accords to stand in the face of daily challenges on the ground, ordinary Palestinians needed to perceive positive change in their lives. Therefore, the donors had two major goals: to fuel Palestinian economic growth and to build public support for negotiations with Israel. According to Scott Lasensky, "throughout the follow-up talks to the DoP that produced the Gaza-Jericho Agreement (May 1994), the Early Empowerment Agreement (August 1994), the Interim Agreement (September 1995), and the Hebron Accord (January 1997), [...] economic aid hovered over the process and remained the single most critical external component buttressing the PNA."

=== 1993–2000 ===
Between 1993 and 1997 the PNA faced serious economic and financial problems. International aid prevented the collapse of the local economy, and contributed to the establishment of the Palestinian administration. Donors' pledges continued to increase regularly (their value had risen to approximately $3,420 million as of the end of October 1997) as a result of the faltering peace process, along with the increase in needs and the consequent increase in the assistance necessary for Palestinians to survive. Reality led, however, to a revision of the donors' priorities: Out of concern that the deteriorating economic conditions could result in a derailment of the peace process, donor support was redirected to finance continued budgetary shortfalls, housing programs and emergency employment creation. According to a more critical approach, international aid in the mid-1990s supported PNA's bureaucracy and belatedly promoted the centralization of political power, but in a way that did not enhance government capacity and harmed the PNGOs. In 1994–1995 problems of underfunding, inefficiency and poor aid coordination marked donors' activity, and led to tensions among the different aid bodies, and between the international community and the PNA. In 1996, the link between development assistance and the success of the peace process was made explicit by the President of the World Bank, James Wolfensohn, who stated: "The sense of urgency is clear. Peace will only be assured in that area if you can get jobs for those people."

After 1997, there was a reduction in the use of closure policy by Israel, which led to an employment growth and an expansion of the West Bank and Gaza economy. After the signing of the Wye River Memorandum, a new donors' conference was convened, and over $2 billion was pledged to the PNA for 1999–2003. Nevertheless, overall donor disbursements fell in 1998–2000, and the 1998 disbursements=to-commitments ratio was the lowest since 1994. As for international institutions, they began to play a bigger role in the international funding process, in spite of the decline in the absolute value of these institutions' total commitments. After 1997, the need for donor support for the current budget and employment generation programs receded due to the PA's improved fiscal performance, and attention was focused instead on infrastructures to the detriment of institution building. Donors' activity was also characterized by a decline in support for PNGOs, and by a preference to concessionary loans (instead of grants) with generous grace periods, long repayment periods and low interest rates

=== 2000–2006 ===
The second Intifada led to one of the deepest recessions the Palestinian economy experienced in modern history. In those two years, Palestinian real GDP per capita shrunk by almost 40 percent. The precipitator of this economic crisis was again a multi-faceted system of restrictions on the movement of goods and people designed to protect Israelis in Israel itself and in the settlements.

One of the many frustrations of the crisis was the erosion of the development effort financed by the international community, since the overwhelming emphasis in donor work was now directed towards mitigating the impact of the economic and social crisis. A collapse of the PNA was averted by emergency budget support from donor countries. Despite a significant increase in donor commitments in 2002 compared with 2001, commitments to infrastructure and capacity-building work with a medium-term focus continued to decline. In 2000, the ratio was approximately 7:1 in favor of development assistance. By 2002, the ratio had shifted to almost 5:1 in favor of emergency assistance.

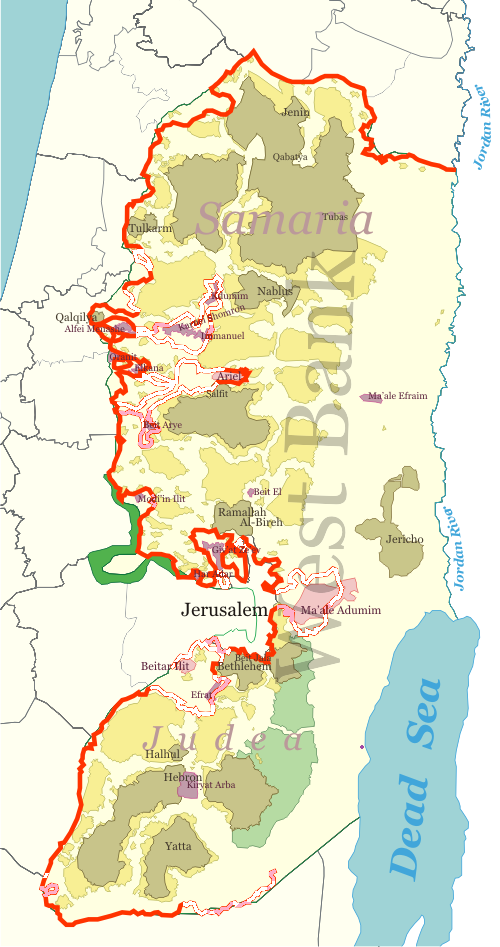
The barrier route as of July 2006

Yasser Arafat's death in 2004 and Israel's unilateral disengagement from Gaza created new hopes to the donor community. In March 2005, the Quartet on the Middle East underscored the importance of development assistance, and urged the international donors community to support Palestinian institution building, without however ignoring budgetary support. The Quartet also urged Israel and the PNA to fulfill their commitments arising from the Road map for peace, and the international community "to review and energize current donor coordination structures [...] in order to increase their effectiveness." The international community's attempt in late 2005 to promote Palestinian economic recovery reflected a long-standing assumption that economic development is crucial to the peace process and to prevent backsliding into conflict. Although a mild positive growth returned in 2003 and 2005, this fragile recovery stalled as a result of the segmentation of the Gaza Strip, the stiff restrictions on movements of goods and people across the borders with Israel and Egypt, and the completion of the Israeli West Bank barrier. As the World Bank stressed in December 2005, "growth will not persist without good Palestinian governance, sound economic management and a continued relaxation of closure by GOI."

=== 2006–07 ===
On 25 January 2006, the Islamist organization, Hamas, which is considered by the main donor countries to be a terrorist organization, won the Palestinian legislative elections and formed government on 29 March 2006, without accepting the terms and conditions set by the Quartet. This resulted in the imposition of economic sanctions against the PA, including near cessation of direct relations and aid between most bilateral donors and the PA, with only some multilateral agencies and a few donors continuing direct contact and project administration. The Quartet's decision was criticised by the Quartet's former envoy, James Wolfensohn, who characterized it "a misguided attempt to starve the Hamas-led Palestinians into submission," and of UN's Middle East former envoy, Alvaro de Soto.

Because of the worsening humanitarian crisis, the EU proposed a plan to channel aid directly to the Palestinians, bypassing the Hamas-led government. The Quartet approved the EU proposal, despite an initial US objection, and the EU set up a "temporary international mechanism" (TIM) to channel funds through the Palestinian President for an initial period of three months, which was later extended. Oxfam was one of the main critics of the EU TIM program arguing that "limited direct payments from the European Commission have failed to address this growing crisis."

The emergence of two rival governments in the West Bank and the Gaza Strip in June 2007 presented the international community with the prospect of shouldering a huge aid burden. The World Bank estimated that in 2008 the PNA would need $1.2 billion in recurrent budget support, in addition to $300 million in development aid. The formation of the emergency government in mid-2007 in the West Bank led by Salam Fayyad, led to the resumption of aid to the West Bank PA government which partly reversed the impact of the aid boycott. Nevertheless, economic indicators have not changed considerably. For instance, because of the situation in Gaza, real GDP growth was estimated to be about -0.5% in 2007, and 0.8% in 2008.

According to the Development Assistance Committee, the main multilateral donors for the 2006–2007 period were UNRWA and the EU (through the European Commission), while the main bilateral donors were the US, Japan, Canada and five European countries (Norway, Germany, Sweden, Spain and France).

=== 2007–09 ===
Paris pledging conference, 2007
Type of assistance	US$ billion
Budget support	1.5
Humanitarian assistance	1.1
Project-based aid	2.1
Other aid	0.8
Amounts being allocated	2.2
Total 2008–2010	7.7

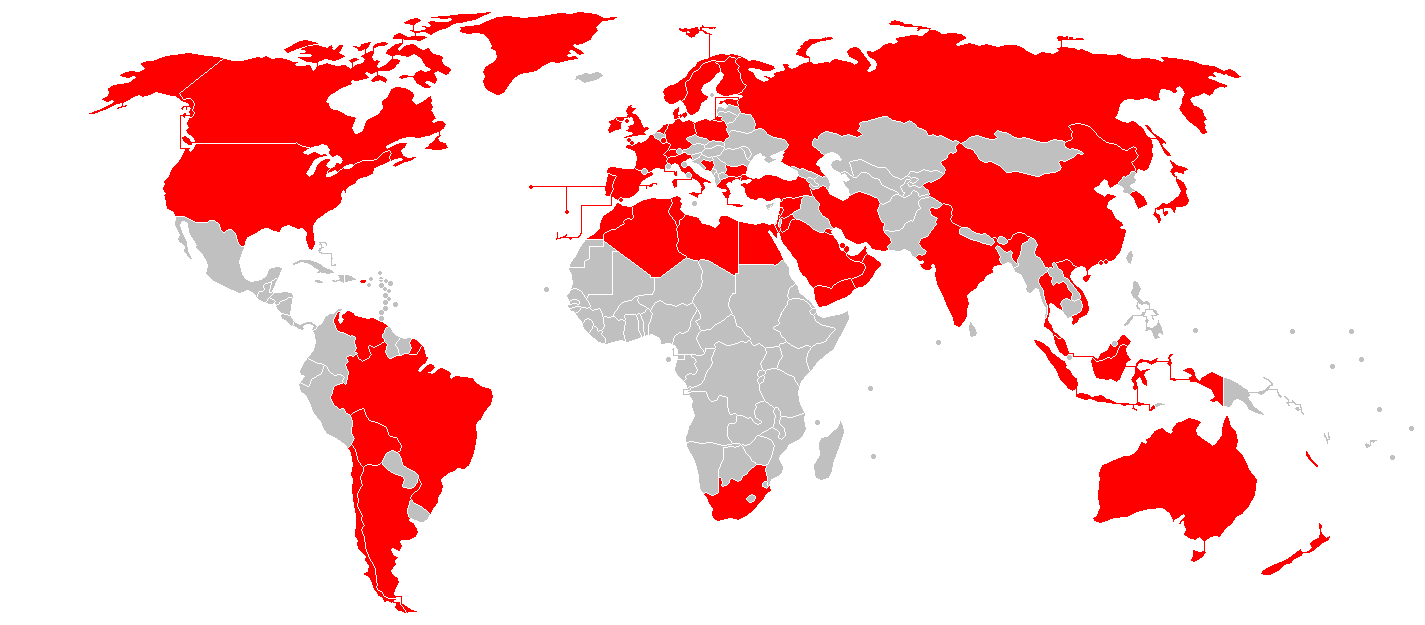
Map of countries giving emergency aid to Gaza in 2009

In December 2007, during the Paris Conference, which followed the Annapolis Conference, donor countries pledged over $7.7 billion for 2008–2010 in support of the Palestinian Reform and Development Program (PRDP). Hamas, which was not invited to Paris, called the conference a "declaration of war" on it. In the beginning of 2008, the EU moved from the TIM mechanism to PEGASE, which provided channels for direct support to the PA's Central Treasury Account in addition to the types of channels used for TIM. The World Bank also launched a trust fund that would provide support in the context of the PA's 2008–2010 reform policy agenda. However, neither mechanism contained sufficient resources to cover the PA's entire monthly needs, thus not allowing the PA to plan expenditures beyond a two-month horizon.

The World Bank assesses that the PA had made significant progress on implementing the reform agenda laid out in the PRDP, and re-establishing law and order. Gaza, however, remained outside the reforms as Hamas controls security and the most important ministry positions there. Palestinian inter-factional tension continued in the West Bank and Gaza, with arrests of people and closures of NGOs by each side, resulting in a deterioration in the ability of civil society organizations to continue to cater to vulnerable groups.

Following the 2008–2009 Israel–Gaza conflict, an international conference took place in Sharm El Sheikh, Egypt where donor countries and international bodies pledged almost US$4.5 billion for humanitarian and reconstruction aid for the Gaza Strip. These funds bypassed Hamas, with the PA in collaboration with the donor community taking the lead in delivering and distributing the funds. Damage from the Israeli offensive was estimated to be almost $2 billion. According to estimates made by the World Bank, the PA received $1.8 billion of international aid in 2008 and $1.4 billion in 2009.

Donors pledged US$4.481 billion at the Sharm el-Sheikh conference to help the Palestinian economy and rebuild the Gaza Strip. The biggest donor was Saudi Arabia with $1 billion, followed by the United States with $900 million, a third for humanitarian aid to the Gaza Strip and the rest to assist the Palestinian Authority of President Mahmoud Abbas. The conference was criticized by Iran. However, actual transfers of aid had been beset by difficulties.

==== Concerns of strengthening Hamas ====
Militant Islamist organization Hamas, which is the de facto governing body of the Gaza Strip, is boycotted by western countries as a terrorist organization. In an international conference on reconstructing Gaza, donors insisted that the aid money for the Gaza Strip must bypass Hamas. An administration official from the United States, which pledged $900 million in aid, said that none of the country's aid would go to Hamas, being funneled instead through United Nations groups and non-governmental organizations. However, congresspersons expressed concern that some money would fall into the hands of Hamas. "To route $900 million to this area, and let's say Hamas was only able to steal 10 percent of that, we would still become Hamas' second-largest funder after Iran," said Representative Mark Kirk (R-Ill.). Danish Foreign Minister Per Stig Møller stressed that aid from Denmark would not end up in the hands of Hamas. Israeli Prime Minister Ehud Olmert said that "Israel supports foreign aid to the Strip, but it is important to build mechanisms and oversight methods to ensure that the aid reaches Gazan civilians and will not be used to strengthen Hamas." Palestinian National Authority President Mahmoud Abbas, of the rival Fatah party, advised international donors to send Gaza reconstruction money directly to property owners, offering a plan that would effectively bypass the territory's Hamas rulers.

On 3 February, 3,500 blankets and over 400 food parcels were confiscated by Hamas police personnel from an UNRWA distribution center. On the following day, the UN Emergency Relief Coordinator demanded that the aid be returned immediately. In a separate incident on 5 February, Hamas seized 200 tons of food from UNRWA aid supplies. The following day, UNRWA suspended its activities in Gaza. Hamas issued a statement stating that the incident was a misunderstanding between the drivers of the trucks and had been resolved through direct contact with the UNRWA. On 9 February, UNRWA lifted the suspension on the movement of its humanitarian supplies into Gaza, after the Hamas authorities returned all of the aid supplies confiscated.

Some local Gaza NGOs providing emergency aid stated that Hamas had ordered them to stop operating because it suspected they were affiliated with rival group Fatah.

==== Israeli and Egyptian governments obstructing aid transfers ====
The Gaza Strip is bordered by Israel and Egypt, and much of the humanitarian aid reaches the strip through Israel. According to the Associated Press, "Israel allows in several dozen truckloads of aid every day, but bars the entry of concrete, pipes and other materials that it fears Hamas could seize." Israel says that cement and steel could be used by militants to build rockets and attack tunnels. UN Secretary-General Ban Ki-moon said that opening border crossings was an "indispensable goal," adding that it was "essential to ensure that illegal weapons do not enter Gaza." U.S. Secretary of State Hillary Clinton expressed anger at Israeli delays in relaying Gaza aid.

On several occasions during the conflict, Egypt prevented the Muslim Brotherhood from delivering aid to Gaza. On 12 February, Egyptian police seized 2,200 tons of food and medical aid destined for the Gaza Strip and being stored by the group, arresting two of its members. A security official said that the two were accused of illegally storing goods. The Muslim Brotherhood is banned in Egypt.

In June 2009 hundreds of Israeli protestors temporarily blocked goods and humanitarian aid from reaching the Gaza Strip. The protesters, waving signs and carrying posters of 22-year-old kidnapped Israeli soldier Gilad Shalit, cut off the approach to three major crossings into the Gaza Strip while dozens of trucks, loaded with aid, waited outside. Israel tightened its blockade of the Gaza Strip stating that it will not remove the blockade until Shalit is freed.

==== Donations ====
Donor	Donation worth (in US$ or €) (US$ millions)	Notes and other assistance
European Union	4.200	Emergency humanitarian aid.
OIC	(Note: No entry in the "Donation worth (USD)" column indicates the amount is presently unknown.)	The OIC aid convoy includes 300 tons of medicine, medical equipment, and food supplies.
Algeria	200.000	President Abdelaziz Bouteflika, announced at the economy and development summit of Arab heads of state, held in Kuwait, that Algeria will contribute up to $200 million for the reconstruction of Gaza. Government announced that Algeria will send medical aid. A team of doctors and surgeons would accompany the aid package, which includes medical supplies. Humanitarian aid consisted of 37 tons of food and medicine and was dispatched on January 18.
Argentina		Foreign Minister Jorge Taiana designated the White Helmets Commission to coordinate with the Ministries of Health and Social Action, sending humanitarian aid to the Gaza Strip which consists of food aid, medicines, tents and water treatment tablets. Argentina sent the first aid shipment on January 16, consisting of 4 tons of humanitarian aid.
Australia	3.500	Acting Prime Minister Julia Gillard said that "as part of its commitment to help support people caught up in the conflict, the Australian government will make an immediate commitment of A$5 million in additional assistance to the people of the Gaza Strip and stands ready to consider further assistance in the future".
Bahrain	1.000	A$1 million (BD378,000) aid consignment left Bahrain on board two planes. The initiative was supervised by the Royal Charity Organisation.
Bolivia		Bolivia sent food in coordination with Venezuela.
Bosnia and Herzegovina		Specialised medical teams and medical requirements to Gaza Strip.
Brazil		The Brazilian government sent 14 tons of medicines and food.
Bulgaria		Deputy Prime Minister Ivaylo Kalfin announced that Bulgaria would dispatch humanitarian aid to Gaza despite difficulties.
Canada	3.380	Canada will give 4 million Canadian dollars to the United Nations and Red Cross to be used for humanitarian assistance in the Palestinian Territories. Foreign Affairs Minister Lawrence Cannon said that $3 million will be given to the United Nations Relief and Works Agency (UNRWA) and the remaining $1 million will go to the Red Cross.
Chile		Chile sent 3.5 tons of medical materials as its first consignment. Second consignment consisted of 24 tons aid, mainly milk, blankets, diapers and medicines, shipped on a Chilean Air Force's Boeing 757-300 ER to Amman.
China	1.000	Emergency humanitarian aid for the Palestinian National Authority to buy urgently needed material.
Denmark	3.650	The Development Ministry has contributed 20 million kroner to victims of the crisis.
Egypt		The Egyptian Ministry of Health sent 30 buses to North Sinai to help transport injured Palestinians. Egypt has ordered dozens of ambulances to the Rafah crossing to help evacuate wounded Gazans for treatment in Egypt.
Estonia	0.100	Aid to be delivered via the United Nations.
Finland	0.675	Finland's support was conveyed to the International Committee of the Red Cross (ICRC) through the Finnish Red Cross.
France	4.000	France decided emergency aid of three million euros "in response to the humanitarian situation in Gaza, where the Israeli army is conducting a major operation against the Islamic movement Hamas". One million is intended for the UN office for Palestinian refugees (UNRWA), one million for the World Food Program (WFP) and one million for non-governmental organisations (NGOs), said spokesman for the Minister of Foreign Affairs, Eric Chevallier.
Germany	15.300	Aid for humanitarian efforts in Gaza.
Greece		Two Greek C-130 military airplanes took off on Thursday with a cargo of 280 tons of humanitarian aid. It is one of the largest Greek despatches of blood and blood by-products ever organised, as well as IV drips, antibiotics and other medicinal supplies. Foreign ministry secretary general Theodoros Skylakakis said that aid is one of the first missions that will arrive in Gaza. Second shipment was composed mainly of food and medicines collected by the Church of Greece and other agencies, and was dispatched under the responsibility of the Foreign Ministry's Hellenic Aid. Third shipment departed for Gaza from the port of Piraeus on January 19, in the presence of Foreign Minister Dora Bakoyannis and Archbishop of Athens and All Greece Ieronymos of the Church of Greece. Foreign Minister announced more aid "with much greater fervour, because the humanitarian corridors are open now and, therefore, aid can arrive quickly. No matter how much we send, of course, more is always needed. Therefore, all the agencies coordinated in Greece and the government, of course, and the Church of Greece will combine our strength to enable us to have the best possible results."
India	1.000	Spokesperson of the Ministry of External Affairs Vishnu Prakash today said, "In response to the 'Flash Appeal' made by the United Nations Refugee Welfare Agency (UNRWA), the Indian Government has decided to extend an assistance of US$1 million for use by the agency to provide shelters, cash assistance, essential household items, etc., to affected families in Gaza.".
Indonesia	1.000	In addition to the aid, the government has pledged two tonnes of medical supplies. Islamic organisations in Indonesia have dispatched humanitarian aid to Gaza, worth US$200,000.
Iran	2.500	The government has dispatched planeload of aid, including medicine to Gaza and several ships which also where carrying aid to the Gaza Strip. They have also requested Egypt to open up its borders so that they (Iran) could send more aid, including oil and basic human needs such as clothes and other mechanical needs.
Ireland	0.680	€500,000 in humanitarian aid to Gaza.
Israel	1.000	Injured Palestinian civilians have been taken to Israel medical facilities for care, including Ashkelon's Barzilai Hospital—which was under Hamas rocket fire during the war—and Schneider Children's Hospital. Magen David Adom, the Israeli version of the Red Cross, has been working extensively on the Israeli-Gaza border to treat the injured, with 600 ambulances available around the clock. Physicians for Human Rights-Israel donated about $1 million for medical equipment and medicine to Gaza residents.
Italy	4.130	Total worth of emergency aid, made to several UN agencies either in form of donation or aid is about 3,200,000 EUR. Italy was the first European country to contribute aid.
Japan	10.000	Pledged in humanitarian aid.
Jordan		Jordan Hashemite Charity Organisation dispatched the 15-truck convoy loaded with three kidney dialysis units and a ventilator, while two vehicles carried bread and a third was loaded with bottled drinking water.
Kuwait	534.000	Two military planes with humanitarian aid. First plane carried 10 tons of relief aid with food and medical supplies on board. Second plane will be dispatched with two ambulances and food and medical supplies on board. Aid came upon instructions of Emir Sabah Al-Ahmad Al-Jaber Al-Sabah. Emir also announced that Kuwait would donate US$34 million to honor UN Relief and Works Agency's (UNRWA) immediate needs in Palestinian territories. Emir announced additional US$500 million donation to UNRWA.
Lebanon	1.000	Pledged aid.
Libya		Has sent a plane carrying aid to al-Arish for Gaza.
Luxembourg	0.685	This emergency program aims to provide basic food rations, provide temporary shelter to 5,000 people displaced by the conflict, provide financial support to Palestinian families affected to help cover the medical care required, provide 500,000 liters of fuel to municipalities and other agencies providing public services to the population in the Gaza Strip.
Malaysia	1.000	To be donated via Mercy Malaysia.
Morocco		Two planes were sent with 63 tonnes: 15 tonnes of medicine, 20 tonnes of flour, eight tonnes of sugar, eight tonnes of cooking oil, six tonnes of milk, 4.5 tonnes of cheese and 1.5 tonnes of tea. Three thousands blankets for Gaza have also been carried on the air lift. Morocco said it was ready to care for 200 injured Palestinians.
Netherlands	4.000	Development Cooperation Minister Bert Koenders has pledged three million euros in aid for the Gaza Strip. Two million euros will go to UNRWA, the United Nations relief agency for Palestinians. The remaining one million euros will be given to the Red Crescent.
New Zealand	0.546	The Foreign Affairs Ministry, noted that New Zealand makes an annual contribution to the United Nations Emergency Response Fund, which it considers to be adequate and that for now there will be no additional aid to the Middle East. However, on January 19 Foreign Minister Murray McCully said that "there is a pressing need for humanitarian assistance in Gaza, and the ceasefire provides a window for aid agencies to provide that help" and that New Zealand will donate 1 mln NZ dollars to the Red Cross to provide urgently needed medical supplies and safe drinking water to the civilian population of Gaza, and to care for those affected by the conflict.
Norway	4.320	As one of the first Western states to recognise the Hamas-led government in 2007, Norway has given the donation in "immediate aid" to Gaza.
Oman		The supplies provided include medications, power generators, and medical equipment.
Poland	0.350	Ministry of Foreign Affairs, in response to the appeal issued by the United Nations Relief and Works Agency for Palestine Refugees in the Near East (UNRWA), sent EUR 250,000 immediately to help those who have been most harmed in the Palestinian Authority.
Portugal	0.400	Ministry of Foreign Affairs, in response to the appeal issued by the United Nations Relief and Works Agency for Palestine Refugees in the Near East (UNRWA), sent EUR 400,000 immediately to help Gazans.
Qatar	1.140	NGO Reach Out To Asia (Rota) pledged $1m in humanitarian aid to Palestinians living in the Gaza Strip. Qatar Charity, a non-governmental organisation has delivered medical supplies worth $140,000 to the Palestinian Ministry of Health Hospitals.
Russia		60 tons of tents, medicines and food. President Dmitry Medvedev ordered for additional help to be sent.
Saudi Arabia	1,000.000	King Abdullah bin Abdulaziz announced the donation for the reconstruction of Gaza at an Arab League economic summit in Kuwait. Saudi Arabia also launched "the Custodian of The Two Holy Mosques Campaign to Provide Humanitarian Relief to the Palestinian People in Gaza." This effort is a nationwide endeavor which is coordinated by a number of entities, including representative of the provincial governments. Through this effort 6.5 mln dollars were collected. The $6 million is sent to UNRWA to provide food for the people of Gaza and $500,000 to buy fuel which UNRWA provides to local authorities and utilities in Gaza to pump water and incinerate refuse, both essential operations in prevent outbreaks of disease.
South Africa		84 tons of supplies including: medical equipment, medicines, other medical supplies, high energy and protein supplements, plaster of paris, bottled water, cooking oil, milk powder, glucose biscuits, generators, blankets and disposable nappies also transported a team of 25 South African doctors and journalists to Gaza. Also included in the consignment of humanitarian aid is an ambulance carrying all vital equipment for medical procedures.
South Korea	0.300	Humanitarian aid.
Spain	6,.500	The government of Spain has contributed EUR 5 million to UNRWA in response to the Agency's Flash Appeal for Gaza. This contribution is "unearmarked", appreciating the importance of flexibility for the implementation of UNRWA's response to early recovery needs. Spain also sent 104 tons of humanitarian aid in three shipments.
Sweden	2.200	Given to a UN-administered fund for Gaza in two payments. The Swedish International Development Agency said the funds were being used for hospitals, medicines and food.
Switzerland	2.700	Switzerland has provided humanitarian aid to the civilian population of the Gaza Strip and the West Bank incl. East Jerusalem totalling CHF 12 million in 2008. On 9.1.2009 it was decided to give an extra 3 million.
Syria		Syria sent 600 tons of food, medical supplies, blankets, winter clothes and other basic human needs in three aid convoys.
Thailand	0.028	Thailand will provide an immediate financial contribution of US$28,000 to the United Nations Relief and Works Agency for Palestine Refugees in the Near East (UNRWA) to address the emergency needs of the people affected by the conflict in Gaza.
Tunisia		President Zine El Abidine Ben Ali decided to dispatch aid, as a sign of solidarity with the Palestinian people. Aid consisted of 16 tons of medicine, foodstuff, blankets and tents.
Turkey	63.000	63 million dollar donated, 11,000 boxes of food and 100 trucks of medicine, food and humanitarian aid supplied, 5 ambulances donated.
United Arab Emirates	91.300	UAE raised $85.8M in the first days of a campaign to collect aid for the Palestinian victims. United Arab Emirates also donated $5,5 million to Red Cross/Red Crescent.
United Kingdom	40.000	The donation is to be made in the form of food, fuel and medicine supplies to Gaza.
United States	20.300	President George W. Bush said "We care about the people of Gaza, and, therefore, have provided millions of dollars of fresh aid to the United Nations to help". President Barack Obama authorised the use of $20.3 million in emergency funding for immediate humanitarian assistance to Palestinian refugees and conflict victims in the Gaza Strip.
Venezuela		Venezuelan sent an airplane with the first 80 tons of medicine, foods and water, accompanied by the task force Simon Bolivar and 30 Venezuelan doctors. Venezuela sent a second batch of humanitarian aid—the 84 tons of aid that includes 50 tons of food, 19 tons of medicines and medical materials, 10 tons of water and five tons of commodities.
Vietnam	0.200	The Vietnamese Government granted US$200,000 in emergent humanitarian aid to the Palestinians in Gaza. The funds are channeled via the UN Relief and Works Agency (UNRWA) for Palestine Refugees in the Middle East.
Yemen		Yemen has prepared 42 tons of aid for the people of Gaza. Yemen has also declared its readiness to receive 500 injured Palestinians from the Gaza Strip and treat them in Yemeni hospitals.

=== 2010 ===
In 2010, the lion's share of the aid came from the European Union and the United States. According to estimates made by the World Bank, the PA received $525 million of international aid in the first half of 2010. Foreign aid is the "main driver" of economic growth in the Palestinian territories. According to the International Monetary Fund, the unemployment rate has fallen as the economy of Gaza grew by 16% in the first half of 2010, almost twice as fast as the economy of the West Bank.

In July 2010, Germany outlawed a major Turkish-German donor group, the Internationale Humanitaere Hilfsorganisation (IHH) (unaffiliated to the Turkish İnsani Yardım Vakfı (İHH)) that sent the Mavi Mamara aid vessel, saying it had used donations to support projects in Gaza that are related to Hamas, which is considered by the European Union to be a terrorist organization, while presenting their activities to donors as humanitarian help. German Interior Minister Thomas de Maiziere said, "Donations to so-called social welfare groups belonging to Hamas, such as the millions given by IHH, actually support the terror organization Hamas as a whole."

=== 2011 ===
In March 2011, there were threats to cut off aid to the PA if it continued to move forward on a unity government with Hamas, unless Hamas formally renounced violence, recognized Israel, and accepted previous Israel-Palestinian agreements. Azzam Ahmed, spokesman for PA President Abbas, responded by stating that the PA was willing to give up financial aid in order to achieve unity, "Palestinians need American money, but if they use it as a way of pressuring us, we are ready to relinquish that aid."

=== 2014 ===
In October 2014, the Cairo Conference on Palestine, an international donor conference on reconstructing the Gaza Strip, garnered $5.4 billion in pledges, of which $1 billion was pledged by Qatar. Half of the pledges were to be used for rebuilding efforts in Gaza, while the remainder was to support the PA budget until 2017.

=== 2018 ===
On 23 March 2018, U.S. President Donald Trump signed the Taylor Force Act into law, which will cut about a third of US foreign aid payments to the PA, until the PA ceases making payment of stipends to terrorists and their surviving families.

In July 2018, Australia stopped the A$10M (US$7.5M) in funding that had been sent to the PA via the World Bank, and instead is sending it to the UN Humanitarian Fund for the Palestinian Territories. The reason given was that they did not want the PA to use the funds to assist Palestinians convicted of politically motivated violence.

On 24 August, the United States cut more than $200 million in direct aid to the PA. The administration had previously cut aid to several UN bodies devoted to the Palestinian cause, including cutting $300 million off the contribution to United Nations Relief and Works Agency (UNRWA), and the UN Human Rights Council.

=== 2019 ===
In February 2019, the US stopped all USAID to Palestinians in the West Bank and Gaza. The US stopped providing more than $60m in annual funds for the Palestinian security services at the request of the PA because of a fear of lawsuits following the enactment of the Anti-Terrorism Clarification Act of 2018 (ATCA), which came into force in February 2019, and allows Americans to sue in US courts those receiving US foreign aid over alleged complicity in "acts of war". The stopping of funding for security services has raised some concerns.

In November 2019, the Netherlands cut the US$1.5 million per annum it paid directly to the Palestinian Authority over payments it makes to families of militants killed, hurt, or imprisoned by Israel (described by Israel as salaries to terrorists).

== Hamas takeover and Israeli blockade of the Gaza Strip ==
In 2007, Israel, the Quartet on the Middle East (comprising the United Nations, the United States, the European Union, and Russia) and other countries ceased providing aid to the PA Hamas-led government that refused to accept the conditions set by them, and imposed sanctions against the PA. After Hamas took control of the Gaza Strip and a non-Hamas government installed in the West Bank, the sanctions against the PA administered West Bank were withdrawn and donations resumed. Israel and Egypt imposed a land, air, and sea blockade of the Gaza Strip, which is ongoing. The PA administration imposed its own sanctions against the Hamas-ruled Gaza Strip.

Since 2014, with Israel's approval despite the blockade, Qatar has provided aid to the Gaza Strip that has partially relieved some of the economic pressure on the Gaza Strip. Between 2014 and 2019, Qatar has provided over $1 billion in reconstruction funds and stipends for poor Palestinians.

== Major donors ==
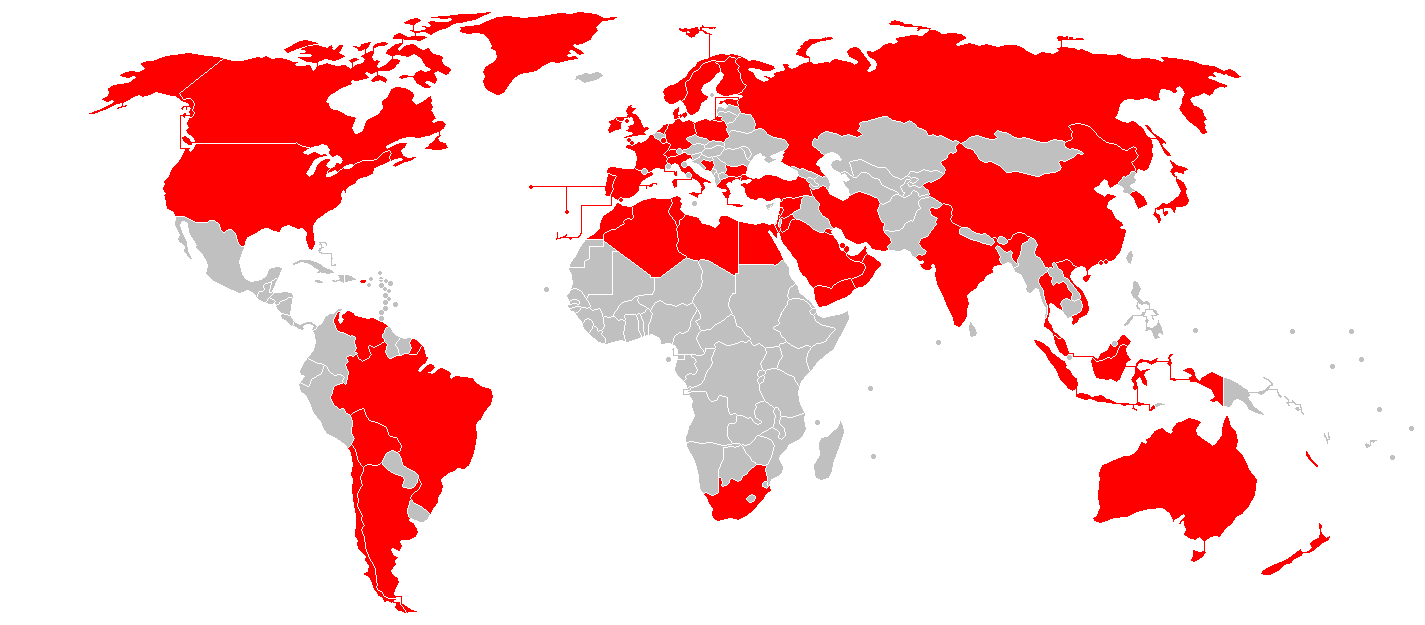
Map of countries giving emergency aid to Gaza in 2009

Since 1993 the European Commission and the EU member-states combined have been by far the largest aid contributor to the Palestinians.

Arab League states have also been substantial donors, notably through budgetary support of the PNA during the Second Intifada. However, they have been criticized for not sufficiently financing the UNRWA and the PNA, and for balking at their pledges. After the 2006 Palestinian elections, the Arab countries tried to contribute to the payment of wages for Palestinian public servants, bypassing the PNA. At the same time, Arab funds were paid directly to Abbas' office for disbursement.

During the Paris Conference, 11% of the pledges came from the US and Canada, 53% from Europe and 20% from Arab countries.

The US is also a major contributor, providing more than $5.2 billion through USAID since 1994. In recent years, this aid has totaled around $600 million annually. Since April 2021, the United States has provided over half a billion dollars in assistance for the Palestinians, including more than $417 million in humanitarian assistance for Palestinians through UNRWA, $75 million in support through USAID, and $20.5 million in COVID and Gaza recovery assistance.

== Donor coordination ==
The Ad Hoc Liaison Committee (AHLC) was established in November 1993 to coordinate donor donations and in an effort to balance competing United States and European positions, to facilitate agenda-setting, reduce duplication, and foster synergies. The AHLC operates on the basis of consensus, and aims at promoting dialogue between the partners of the "triangular partnership", namely the donors, Israel and the Palestinian Authority.

== UNRWA ==
The United Nations Relief and Works Agency for Palestine Refugees in the Near East (UNRWA) was set up in 1949 to provide humanitarian relief to Palestinians displaced by the 1948 Arab–Israeli War. Originally, it was intended to provide jobs on public works projects and direct relief. Today, UNRWA provides education (which accounts for 60% of its budget), health care, and social services to more than 5 million registered Palestinian refugees and their descendants, and other segments of Palestinian society, as well as providing some financial aid to Palestinians. UNRWA has also been a donor to the PA. UNRWA employs over 30,000 staff, 99% of whom are locally recruited Palestinians. Most of UNRWA's funding comes from European countries and the United States. Between 2000 and 2015 the European Union contributed €1.6 billion to UNRWA. In addition to its regular budget, UNRWA receives funding for emergency activities and special projects.

- In 2009, UNRWA's total budget was US$1.2 billion, of which it received US$948 million. In 2009, the retiring Commissioner General spoke of a $200 million shortfall in UNRWA's budgets. Officials in 2009 spoke of a 'dire financial crisis'.
- In 2010, the biggest contributors to its regular budget were the United States and the European Commission with $248 million and $165 million respectively. Sweden ($47m), the United Kingdom ($45m), Norway ($40m), and the Netherlands ($29m) were also important donors.
- In 2011, the US was the largest single contributor with a total contribution of over $239 million, followed by the European Commission's $175 million contribution.
- According to World Bank data, for all countries receiving more than $2 billion international aid in 2012, Gaza and the West Bank received a per capita aid budget over double the next largest recipient, at a rate of $495.
- In 2013, $1.1 billion was contributed to UNRWA, of which $294 million was contributed by the United States, $216.4 million by the EU, $151.6 million by Saudi Arabia, $93.7 million by Sweden, $54.4 million by Germany, $53 million by Norway, $34.6 million by Japan, $28.8 million by Switzerland, $23.3 million by Australia, $22.4 million by the Netherlands, $20 million by Denmark, $18.6 million by Kuwait, $17 million by France, $12.3 million by Italy, $10.7 million by Belgium as well as $10.3 million by all other countries.
- In 2016, the US contributed $368 million to UNRWA, and $350 million in 2017, but has cut around one-third of its contributions for 2018. In January 2018, the US withheld $65 million, roughly half the amount due in the month, again creating a financial crisis for UNRWA. Belgium and the Netherlands announced a plan to increase their contributions to UNRWA. In August 2018, the US cut its annual contribution of $360m to UNRWA, citing many complaints, including the number of Palestinians UNRWA recognizes as refugees, which number more than 5 million. In mid-2019, Netherlands, Belgium and Switzerland temporarily suspended funding to UNRWA. In December 2019, the Netherlands restored funding to UNRWA, increasing its donation by €6 million for 2019, to €19 million.
- In 2021, the European Parliament placed conditions on its funding to the UNRWA. In April 2021, the US contributed $150 million to UNRWA, on condition that the funds are not used to assist any refugee receiving military training or has participated in any terrorist act. The US was the largest single donor to UNRWA in 2021, contributing over $338 million. UNRWA received over $1.18 billion in donations in 2021 from various nations and organizations.
- In 2022, the US was the largest single donor to UNRWA, contributing $344 million. UNRWA received over $1.17 billion in 2022 from various nations and organizations.

== USAID ==
The U.S. Agency for International Development (USAID) provided financial support to the Palestinian people for various development and humanitarian projects up to 2019. Since 1994, the United States has provided more than $5.2 billion in aid to Palestinians through USAID. There have been some reports suggesting that USAID had not properly accounted for the risks of providing aid to West Bank and Gaza, including the risk of giving money to local groups that have terrorist ties, when other aid organizations and countries chose not to use those risky groups as local partners in their foreign aid projects. The USAID official told the inspector general that "such restrictions reduce the number of potential partners available to the mission." Some examples of USAID projects in Palestine include:

1. Small and Medium Enterprise Assistance for Recovery and Transition (SMART): This project was launched on February 28, 2022. It offers immediate financial support for small and medium-sized enterprises (SMEs) and "sustainable systemic strengthening" for the Palestinian economy. The project seeks to help Palestinian SMEs and startups rapidly recover from shocks and create job opportunities.
2. Palestinian Community Infrastructure Development (PCID) Program: This program concluded on December 14, 2022, and created 12,500 short-term jobs for Palestinians. Key accomplishments were:
  - Installation of 18 water networks and construction of 10 water reservoirs, allowing 7 communities have access to proper drainage and sewage systems. This resulted in 418,660 people having improved access to drinking/domestic water.
  - Renovation/construction of 8 schools which benefitted 2,230 students. 2 additional educational centers were constructed.
  - Upgrade and improvement of 4 internal roads. Construct/rehabilitate 2 public parks and 2 markets.
  - Construct and renovate 4 youth centers and 3 centers for persons with disabilities. Construct 1 women's center and 1 health clinic.
  - Renovate and expand 1 home for the elderly.
3. Near East Foundation (NEF)'s USAID-funded Olive Oil Without Borders: This project is boosting economic cooperation between Palestinian and Israeli olive farmers.

== Human rights organizations concerns ==
In June 2016, the Euro-Mediterranean Human Rights Monitor released a report, titled Squandered Aid: Israel's repetitive destruction of EU-funded projects in Palestine, discussing Israel's repeated destruction of EU-funded projects in the Palestinian territories. The report claimed that, since 2001, Israel had destroyed around 150 development projects, which incurs the EU a financial loss of approximately €58 million. The report estimated the total value of EU squandered aid money, including development and humanitarian projects, amounted to €65 million, of which at least €23 million was lost during the 2014 Israel–Gaza conflict alone. The Monitor called for an investigation on all destroyed structures built with funding from the UN, EU or member states on Palestinian land. In addition, the Monitor recommended continued investing in Palestinian development, but substantively penalize the Israeli government when UN- or European-funded projects are targeted.

=== 2023 ===
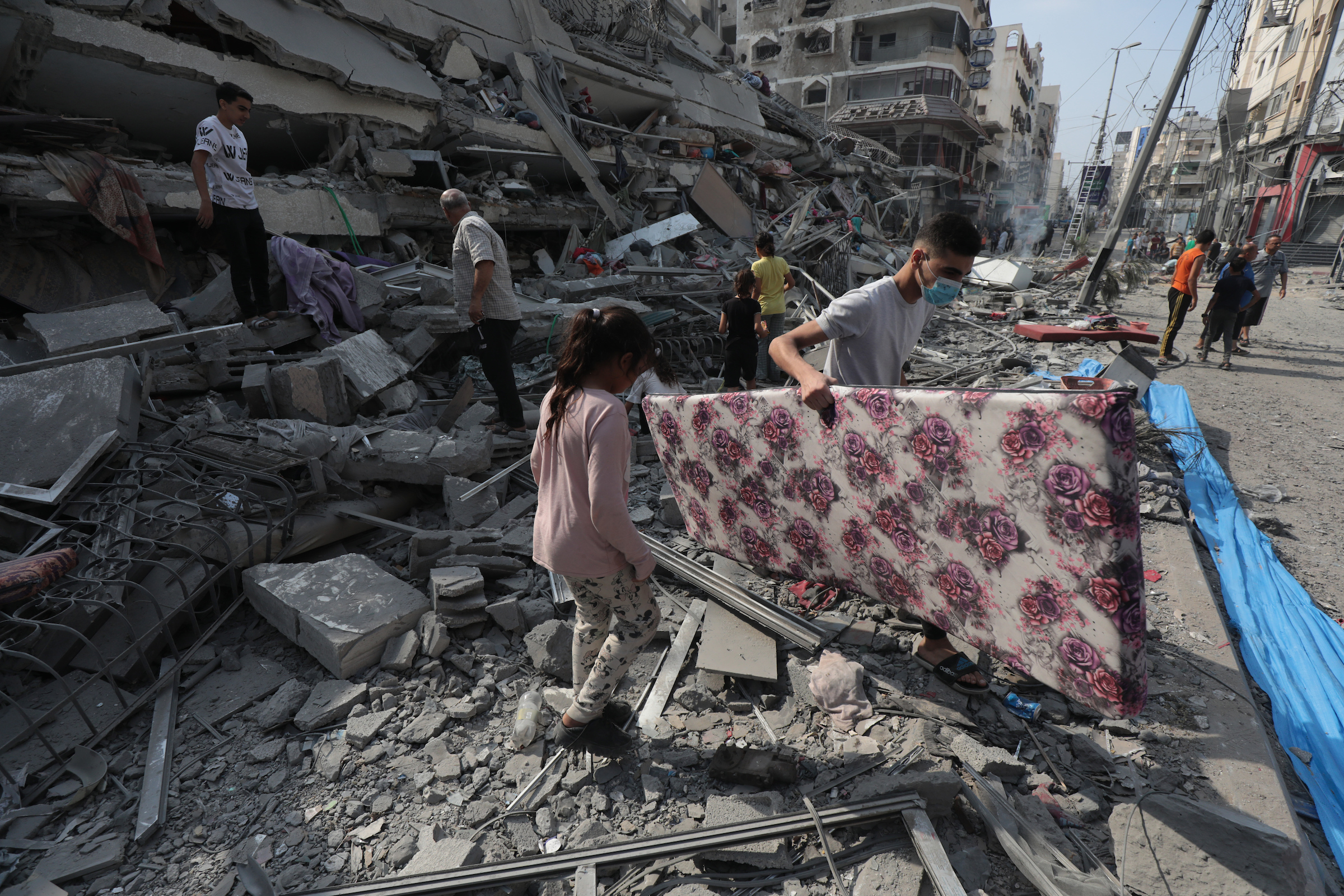
Residents inspect the ruins of an apartment destroyed by Israeli airstrikes.

In 2023, concerns over Hamas redirected aid for military activities were expressed after a 2021 Hamas propaganda video showed Hamas members digging up and dismantling pipelines to produce rockets such as the Qassam rocket which is commonly assembled from industrial piping. As of 2021 the EU provided €9 million for the purchase of bulk pipes in Gaza City and Jabalia and in 2023 £26 million has been spent by Brussels for expanding pipelines networks in Palestine. UK which had provided significant aid for building pipelines in Palestine has denied that its funds could be abused by Hamas.

The humanitarian situation in Gaza has been termed a "crisis" and a "catastrophe". As a result of Israel's siege, Gaza faces shortages of fuel, food, medication, water, and medical supplies. UN Humanitarian Aid chief Martin Griffiths said, "the noose around the civilian population in Gaza is tightening." On 13 October, UNRWA commissioner Philippe Lazzarini said, "The scale and speed of the unfolding humanitarian crisis is bone-chilling."

On 16 October, doctors warned of an impending disease outbreak due to hospital overcrowding and unburied bodies. The same day, the World Health Organization stated there were only "24 hours of water, electricity and fuel left" before "a real catastrophe". On 18 October, the United States vetoed a UN resolution urging humanitarian aid to Gaza. The World Health Organization stated the situation in Gaza was "spiralling out of control."

=== 2026 ===
In July 2026 the United Nations Deputy Special Coordinator for the Middle East Peace Process, and Resident and Humanitarian Coordinator for the Occupied Palestinian Territory, Dr. Ramiz Alakbarov, issued a statement condemning the blockage of humanitarian aid by the "de facto authorities" who forced their way into Abu Rashid food distribution point in Jabalia, North Gaza, and a WFP warehouse and reportedly assaulted drivers delivering supplies. He continued that this is part of a pattern of incidents which includes impediments to delivery of supplies, menacing staff and reducing space for humanitarian activities. He called for an immediate end to this obstruction. According to Al Jazeera, Hamas responded by denying these claims.

== Hamas funding ==
Unlike the Palestine Liberation Organization (PLO) in the West Bank, Hamas is designated as a terrorist entity, so the United States and the European Union (EU) do not provide any financial assistance to Hamas. Historically, Palestinian expatriates and private donors provided much of Hamas' funding. Some Western Islamic charities have channeled money to Hamas-related social service groups, causing the U.S. Treasury to freeze these assets. Israel has allowed Qatar to give hundreds of millions of dollars in aid through Hamas.

Hamas has collected revenue for years by taxing goods that moved through its tunnels and through the Salah al-Din border crossing. Hamas has reportedly accumulated over $12 million per month from taxes on goods imported from Egypt into Gaza as of 2021. Iran provides some $100 million annually to Hamas and other Palestinian groups.

== See also ==
- Ad Hoc Liaison Committee
- Saudi foreign assistance
- United States foreign aid
- United States security assistance to the Palestinian National Authority
- American Near East Refugee Aid
- Palestine Children's Relief Fund
- Coordinator of Government Activities in the Territories COGAT, which admits the aid to Gaza
- International reaction to the 2008–2009 Israel–Gaza conflict
- Reaction to 2006 Israel–Gaza conflict
- Antisemitic incidents during the Gaza War (2008–2009)
- Seven Jewish Children

== Sources ==
- Aid Effectiveness in the West Bank and Gaza. Japan and the World Bank. 1999.
- "At Riyadh Summit, Arab States to Propose Increasing Aid to PA". The Associated Press. March 25, 2007. Archived from the original on 2009-02-15.
- Ball, Nicole; Friedman, Jordana D.; Rossiter, Caleb S. (2000). "The Role of International Financial Institutions in Preventing and Resolving Conflict". In David Cortright (ed.). The Proce of Peace: Incentives and International Conflict Prevention. Rowman & Littlefield. ISBN 0-8476-8557-8.
- Brynen, Rex (2000). A very Political Economy: Peacebuilding and Aid in the West Bank and Gaza. Washington: United States Institute of Peace. ISBN 1-929223-04-8.
- Brynen, Rex (2005). "Donor Assistance"Lessons from Palestine for Afghanistan". In Gerd Junne; Willemijn Verkoren (eds.). Postconflict Development: Meeting New Challenges. Lynne Rienner Publishers. ISBN 1-58826-303-7.
- Brynen, Rex; Awartani, Hisham; Woodcraft, Clare (2000). "The Palestinian Territories". In Shepard Forman; Stewart Patrick (eds.). Good Intentions: Pledges of Aid for Postconflict Recovery. Lynne Rienner Publishers. ISBN 1-55587-879-2.
- Cooper, Helene; Erlanger, Steven (August 3, 2007). "Rice Backs Appointed Palestinian Premier and Mideast Democracy". Middle East. New York Times. Archived from the original on 2018-11-28.
- "Criteria Set for Palestinian Aid". BBC News. January 31, 2006. Archived from the original on 2016-03-04.
- "Disengagement, the Palestinian Economy and the Settlements" (PDF). World Bank. June 23, 2004. Archived from the original (PDF) on June 7, 2007.
- "Donor Disbursements and Public Investment". Report on the Palestinian Economy. UNSCO. Autumn 1999. Archived from the original on 2005-12-18.
- Eldar, Akiva (March 3, 2006). "Quartet to Hold Key Talks on Fate of its Mideast Peacemaking Role". Haaretz. Archived from the original on 2009-05-19.
- "EU Must Resume Aid to Palestinian Authority". Oxfam International. September 14, 2006. Archived from the original on 2008-10-14.
- "Failing the Palestinian State, Punishing its People" (PDF). International Federation for Human Rights. October 2006. Archived (PDF) from the original on 2016-09-21.
- Freund, Michael (February 9, 2007). "Do Arab States really Care about the Palestinians?". Jerusalem Post. Archived from the original on 2016-03-04.
- Frisch, Hillel; Hofnung, Menachem (1997). "State Formation and International Aid: The Emergence of the Palestinian Authority". World Development. 25 (8): 1243–1255. doi:10.1016/S0305-750X(97)00028-4.
- "Fund-Channeling Options For Early Recovery and beyond". World Bank. March 2, 2009. Archived from the original (PDF) on 2011-10-06.
- Hanafi, Sari; Tabar, Linda (2005). The Emergence of a Palestinian Globalized Elite - Donors, International Aid and Local NGOs. Jerusalem: The Institute for Palestinian Studies and Muwatin, the Palestinian Institute for the Study of Democracy. ISBN 9950-332-00-1.
- Hever, Shir (April–May 2005). "Do Palestinians Get the Most Foreign Aid in the World?". Palestine/Israel: News Within/From. 21 (3): 13–17. Archived from the original on October 31, 2007.
- "Implementing the Palestinian Reform and Development Agenda" (PDF). World Bank. May 2, 2008. Archived (PDF) from the original on 2016-03-03.
- Keating, Michael (2005). "Introduction". In Michael Keating; Anne Le More; Robert Lowe (eds.). Aid, Diplomacy and Facts on the Ground. London-Washington: Chatham House – Royal Institute of International Affairs. ISBN 1-86203-164-9.
- Lasensky, Scott (2004). "Paying for Peace: The Oslo Process and the Limits of American Foreign Aid" (PDF). Middle East Journal. 58 (2): 210–234. doi:10.3751/58.2.13. Archived from the original (PDF) on 2004-06-23.
- Lasensky, Scott (March 2002). "Underwriting Peace in the Middle East: US Foreign Policy and the Limits of Economic Inducements" (PDF). Middle East Review of International Affairs. 6 (1): 89–105. Archived (PDF) from the original on 2008-11-26.
- Lasensky, Scott; Grace, Robert (August 2006). "Dollars and Diplomacy: Foreign Aid and the Palestinian Question". USIPeace Briefing. United States Institute of Peace. Archived from the original on October 10, 2007.
- Le More, Anne (2004). "Foreign Aid Strategy". In Cobham, David P. (ed.). The Economics of Palestine. Routledge. ISBN 0-415-32761-X.
- Le More, Anne (October 2005). "Killing with Kindness:Funding the Demise of a Palestinian State". International Affairs. 81 (5): 981–999. doi:10.1111/j.1468-2346.2005.00498.x.
- McCarthy, Rony; Williams, Ian (June 13, 2007). "Secret UN Report Condemns US for Middle East Failures". guardian.co.uk. Archived from the original on 2016-04-30.
- McCarthy, Rony; Williams, Ian (June 13, 2007). "UN was Pummelled into submission, Says Outgoing Middle East Special Envoy". guardian.co.uk. Archived from the original on 2016-03-24.
- "Middle East Quartet Should End Palestinian Authority Aid Boycott and Press Israel to Release Confiscated Taxes". Oxfam GB. February 21, 2007. Archived from the original on 2008-06-22.
- "Overview: Stagnation or Revival? Israeli Disengagement and Palestinian Economic Prospects" (PDF). World Bank. December 1, 2004. Archived (PDF) from the original on 2016-03-03.
- "Overview of Pegase". European Commission Technical Assistance Office for the West Bank & Gaza Strip. Archived from the original on 2009-03-22.
- Palestine Human Development Report (PDF). Ramallah-Gaza: Birzeit University - Development Studies Program. 2004. ISBN 9950-334-01-2. Archived from the original (PDF) on 2007-08-17.
- "Palestinian Adm. Areas". Development Assistance Committee. Archived from the original on 2007-02-12.
- "Palestinian Economic Prospects: Aid, Access and Reform" (PDF). World Bank. September 22, 2008. Archived (PDF) from the original on 2016-03-03.
- "Palestinians to Get Interim Aid". Middle East. BBC News. May 10, 2006. Archived from the original on 2016-08-08.
- "Palestinians Win "$7bn Aid Vow"". Middle East. BBC News. December 17, 2007. Archived from the original on 2016-08-08.
- Pleming, Sue; Sharp, Alastair (March 3, 2009). "Donors Pledge £3.2 billion for Gaza". International Herald Tribune. Archived from the original on 2020-11-20.
- "Powers Agree Palestinian Aid Plan". Middle East. BBC News. June 18, 2006. Archived from the original on 2016-03-04.
- "Quartet Statement – London". Jerusalem Media and Communication Center. March 1, 2005. Archived from the original on August 15, 2007.
- Rocard, Michel (1999). "International Donor Community". Strengthening Palestinian Public Institutions. Council on Foreign Relations. ISBN 0-87609-262-8.
- Roy, Sara (Summer 1995). "Alienation or Accommodation". Journal of Palestine Studies. 24 (4): 73–82. doi:10.1525/jps.1995.24.4.00p0007d. JSTOR 2537759.
- Rubin, Barry (January 1998). "Israel, the Palestinian Authority, and the Arab States". Mideast Security and Policy Studies. 36. Archived from the original on 2016-03-10.
- Sayigh, Yezid (1 September 2007). "Inducing a Failed State in Palestine". Survival. 49 (3). Routledge: 7–39. doi:10.1080/00396330701564786. S2CID 154121051.
- "Statement by Rodrigo de Rato Managing Director of the International Monetary Fund at the London Meeting on Supporting the Palestinian National Authority". UNISPAL. March 1, 2005.
- "The Palestinian Economy and the Prospects for its Recovery" (PDF). World Bank. December 2005. Archived from the original (PDF) on 2007-03-30.
- "The Palestinian War-Torn Economy: Aid, Development and State Formation" (PDF). United Nations Conference on Trade and Development. 2006. Archived (PDF) from the original on 2014-12-22.
- Turner, Mandy (1 December 2006). "Building Democracy in Palestine: Liberal Peace Theory and the Election of Hamas". Democratization. 13 (5): 739–755. doi:10.1080/13510340601010628. S2CID 144616635.
- "Twenty-Seven Months - Intifada, Closures and Palestinian Economic Crisis - An Assessment" (PDF). World Bank. May 2003. Archived from the original (PDF) on March 15, 2008.
- "Two Years after London - Restarting Palestinian Economic Recovery" (PDF). World Bank. September 24, 2007. Archived (PDF) from the original on 2016-03-03.
- "US Blocks Palestinian Aid". Middle East. BBC News. May 5, 2006. Archived from the original on 2016-01-15.
- "West Bank and Gaza: An Evaluation of Bank Assistance" (PDF). OECD. March 7, 2002. Archived from the original (PDF) on 2007-08-17.
