= Mohammad Daajna =

Palestinian major general

Military service
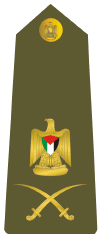
- Rank: Major General

Mohammad Mahmoud Ahmad Dajani (born 1976) is a Palestinian military officer with the rank of major general. Since 23 November 2024, he has served as Commander of the Palestinian Presidential Guard.

== Education ==
Dajani completed high school between 1993 and 1994 in Yatta, Hebron Governorate. In 1994, he joined the military academy in Algeria, graduating with a bachelor's degree in air defense in 1998. He has participated in several specialized local and international courses in VIP protection, counterterrorism, rapid intervention, and crisis management.

== Career ==
After graduating from the Higher School of Air Defense, Dajani joined the Palestinian Presidential Guard. He served in operations, then in the special protection unit for President Yasser Arafat, and later moved to the financial and administrative division. He served in the rapid intervention unit, then led training for the Guard. He accompanied President Mahmoud Abbas for many years as a bodyguard and served as Deputy Commander of the Presidential Guard.

On 23 November 2024, he was appointed Commander of the Palestinian Presidential Guard.

In February 2025, he was appointed to the Board of Trustees of the Palestinian military Al-Istiqlal University.
