= 2006–2007 economic sanctions against the Palestinian National Authority =

Sanctions following Hamas's elections

Economic sanctions and other measures were taken by Israel, the United States and other countries against the Palestinian National Authority (PA), including the suspension of international aid following the decisive victory for Hamas at the Palestinian Legislative Council (PLC) election on 25 January 2006.

On 18 February 2006, following the swearing in of the new PLC, Israel imposed sanctions on the PA, including the suspension of transfers to the PA of customs revenues Israel collected on the PA's behalf. The US sanctions prohibited all Hamas-related financial transactions. The Middle East Quartet called for a review of all assistance to any new government that was formed against its commitment to the principles of nonviolence, recognition of Israel, and acceptance of agreements previously entered into by the PA. After Hamas rejected the conditions, the international community suspended international aid to Palestinians, significantly damaging the Palestinian economy. On 17 June, a temporary international mechanism was created to channel aid to Palestinians bypassing the Hamas-led Palestinian Authority or aid funds were paid directly to the accounts of President Mahmoud Abbas.

After the formation by Abbas of an emergency government in June 2007, international aid to the Ramallah-based PA resumed, but the Hamas-led government in Gaza remained under boycott. The US and Israel lifted sanctions against the Abbas government.

== After the 2006 elections ==
The Palestinian Authority legislative elections were held on 25 January 2006 and resulted in a decisive victory for Hamas.

On 30 January 2006, the Middle East Quartet — comprising the United States, Russia, United Nations, and European Union – issued a statement, saying that "It is the view of the Quartet that all members of a future Palestinian government must be committed to nonviolence, recognition of Israel, and acceptance of previous agreements and obligations, including the Roadmap," and concluded that it was inevitable that future assistance to any new government would be reviewed by donors against that government's commitment to those principles, which Hamas rejected. Although the Quartet formally did not call for sanctions and did not explicitly prohibit the provision of aid to the Hamas-led Palestinian Authority (PA), but rather called for aid to be 'reviewed' against the three principles, a combination of political pressure and US threats of sanctions against banks handling aid monies served to halt transfers to the PA.

On 1 February 2006, Israel announced that it will suspend transfers of customs revenues to the PA, and noted that future transfers will be put on hold while the issue was being reviewed. On 18 February, after the new PLC was sworn in, Israel imposed sanctions on the Palestinian Authority, including suspension of some $50 million in monthly PA customs revenues, and travel restrictions on Hamas members were imposed. Acting Prime Minister Ehud Olmert said that "It is clear that in light of the Hamas majority in the Palestinian Legislative Council and the instructions to form a new government that were given to the head of Hamas, the PA is - in practice - becoming a terrorist authority".

US Administration officials and some members of Congress warned Hamas leaders that the United States will no longer provide assistance to a Hamas-led PA government unless Hamas changes its charter to recognize Israel's right to exist and renounces the use of violence.

Israeli officials and Western diplomats said that US and Israel were discussing ways to destabilize the Palestinian government so that newly elected Hamas officials will fail and elections will be called again. The intention was to starve the PA of money and international connections. The approach was being discussed at the highest levels of the US State Department and the Israeli government. Israeli military officials discussed cutting Gaza off completely from the West Bank and making the Israeli-Gaza border an international one. Hamas Members of Parliament would be denied to travel freely between Gaza and West Bank.

== Under the Hamas-led Government ==
After the Hamas-led First Haniyeh Government was sworn in on 29 March 2006, both the US and EU cut aid to the Palestinian Authority. Canada also suspended its aid.

On 12 April 2006, the US Treasury's Office of Foreign Assets Control (OFAC) formally determined that Hamas had property interest in transactions of the PA. Consequently, all unauthorized transactions with the PA were prohibited. The general prohibition on transactions, however, also caused difficulty in carrying out financial transaction with non-PA related individuals and entities, as financial institutions around the world took protective measures regarding the OFAC determination.

The US ceased providing both indirect and direct foreign aid to the PA with the exception of some emergency humanitarian assistance. The US said it would withhold $411 million in aid over the next few years and asked for the return of $30 million it had already donated. The CRS Report for Congress wrote on 27 June 2007: "With the suspension of all USAID-managed economic aid to the West Bank and Gaza Strip and the general prohibition on financial transactions by U.S. persons with the PA, the United States has tried to assuage fears that its policies are causing Palestinian suffering."

== Impact ==
Although, despite the suspension of aid to the PA, aid to the Palestinian territories reportedly increased during 2006, poverty climbed sharply during the same period. According to Oxfam, this was because international aid did not compensate for the substantial loss of income created by the withholding of at least $475m of Palestinian tax and customs revenues by Israel. This accounted for around 50% of the PA's monthly income in 2005. Also, the aid came late, it did not generate income, and was less effective. Moreover, the boycott had helped trigger factional violence between Palestinians. Oxfam observed in 2006 dropping incomes, increased poverty, institutional collapse and economic decline. Media reports suggested that the humanitarian situation in the West Bank and Gaza Strip was worsening.

In February 2006, Quartet envoy James Wolfensohn warned that the Palestinian Authority was on the verge of economic collapse within two weeks time, because of the cessation of tax funds to the PA from Israel. In a letter to the US government, Wolfensohn warned that the economic situation could lead to violence. In his report of May 2006, Wolfensohn questioned the decision of Western powers to cut all but humanitarian aid to the Palestinians' Hamas-led government. He recalled that $1.3 billion a year was spent on assistance to the Palestinians and asked: "Will we now simply abandon these goals?"

From April–June 2006, the EU delivered $143 million in emergency assistance. The US provided $300 million in humanitarian and other aid to the Palestinians, intended to bypass the Hamas-led Government, $42 million of which "for promoting democratic alternatives to Hamas".

== Temporary international mechanism ==
The World Bank warned a collapse of the Palestinian infrastructure would be hard to reverse. On 9 May 2006, the Quartet issued a new statement, in which it reiterated its grave concern that the PA government had so far failed to commit itself to the formulated principles. It noted that it had "inevitably impacted direct assistance to that government" and was deeply concerned about the consequences for the Palestinian people.

The Quartet announced an international mechanism to ensure direct delivery of assistance to the Palestinians. In conjunction with the World Bank, the Quartet attempted to find a way to provide some relief to the Palestinians without working with the Hamas-led government. The US softened its hardline position to prevent the PA from collapsing and agreed to a mechanism for indirect funding under pressure of EU and Russia. On 17 June 2006, the Quartet announced the establishment of a temporary international mechanism (TIM), to channel funding directly to Palestinians, while bypassing the Hamas-led PA government.

== Aftermath ==
Following Hamas' takeover of Gaza in June 2007, Israel and the United States announced plans to blockade the Gaza Strip. At the same time, they lifted some of the sanctions on the West Bank, in order to support the Fatah government. On 16 June 2007, United States Consul-General Jacob Walles said that the US was planning to lift the ban on direct aid to the emergency government installed by Palestinian President Mahmoud Abbas. Some Israeli officials said US$300 to $400 million in Palestinian tax revenues may be transferred to the PA, short of the $700 million Abbas was seeking. The Quartet voiced support for Abbas and concern for the humanitarian situation in Gaza, though they did not announce any change in the ban on direct aid.

A few days later, the US ended its 15-month economic and political boycott of the Ramallah-based PA, but the Hamas-led government in Gaza remained under sanction and blockade. The European Union similarly announced plans to resume direct aid to the Palestinians. On 25 June 2007, Israel agreed to transfer hundreds of millions of dollars in tax revenues it had seized to Palestinian President Abbas.

A leaked diplomatic cable from the US embassy in Tel Aviv dated 3 November 2008 revealed that Israel intended to maintain the economy of the Gaza Strip "on the brink of collapse" without "pushing it over the edge", and that Israel intended to keep the Gazan economy functioning at the lowest level possible consistent with avoiding a humanitarian crisis." In October 2010, papers were released which revealed a system to maintain the minimum level. It contained upper and lower warning lines, identifying surpluses and shortages of listed products in Gaza.

Former British Foreign Secretary Jack Straw later expressed regret at the decision to impose sanctions following Hamas's victory, writing in his memoirs he was "uncertain it was right", while Tony Blair believed the Quartet should have instead tried to enter a dialogue with Hamas, rather than isolate them. Similarly, in 2017, Jonathan Powell called the Quartet approach a "terrible mistake" and missed opportunity to "unite Palestinians in a way that's been impossible since".

== See also ==
- International aid to Palestinians
- 2008 breach of the Gaza–Egypt border
