= Palestinian Presidential Guard =

Palestinian security body

- الحرس الرئاسي الفلسطيني
- Emblem of the Palestinian Presidential Guard
- Active: 1994–present
- Country: Palestine
- Allegiance: President of Palestine
- Role: Presidential Guard
- Size: ~3,000
- Part of: Palestinian Security Services
- Garrison/HQ: Ramallah, Palestine

Commanders
- Current commander: Major General Mohammad Daajna
- Notable commanders: Major General Mounir Al-Zoubi (2006 - 2024)

The Palestinian Presidential Guard (officially known as the Special Presidential Guard (SPG); Arabic: الحرس الرئاسي الفلسطيني, romanized: Al-Ḥaras al-Riʼāsī al-Filasṭīnī) is a branch of the Palestinian Security Services under the direct control of the President of the State of Palestine. Its primary role is protection of the President and other VIPs, as well as performing ceremonial functions. The force may also perform special combat functions.

== Establishment ==
The predecessor of the Presidential Guard was the "Presidential Security", established in 1994 by then President of the Palestinian Authority (PA), Yasser Arafat and largely composed of members from Force 17.

In 2006, the Presidential Security was established as a separate force and renamed "Presidential Guard". The Presidential Guard was made up entirely of Fatah activists loyal to Abbas. The US was highly involved with the training of officers, coordinated by Lt. Gen. Keith Dayton. The training was part of a systematic effort to bolster Abbas and his Fatah loyalists to counter the political success of Hamas, who had won the 2006 legislative election and formed the new PA government. Hamas had formed its own security service within the Palestinian Authority, the Executive Force.

As of 2006, the estimated strength of the PPG was some 3,500 men, while a considerable increase was planned.

== Gallery ==
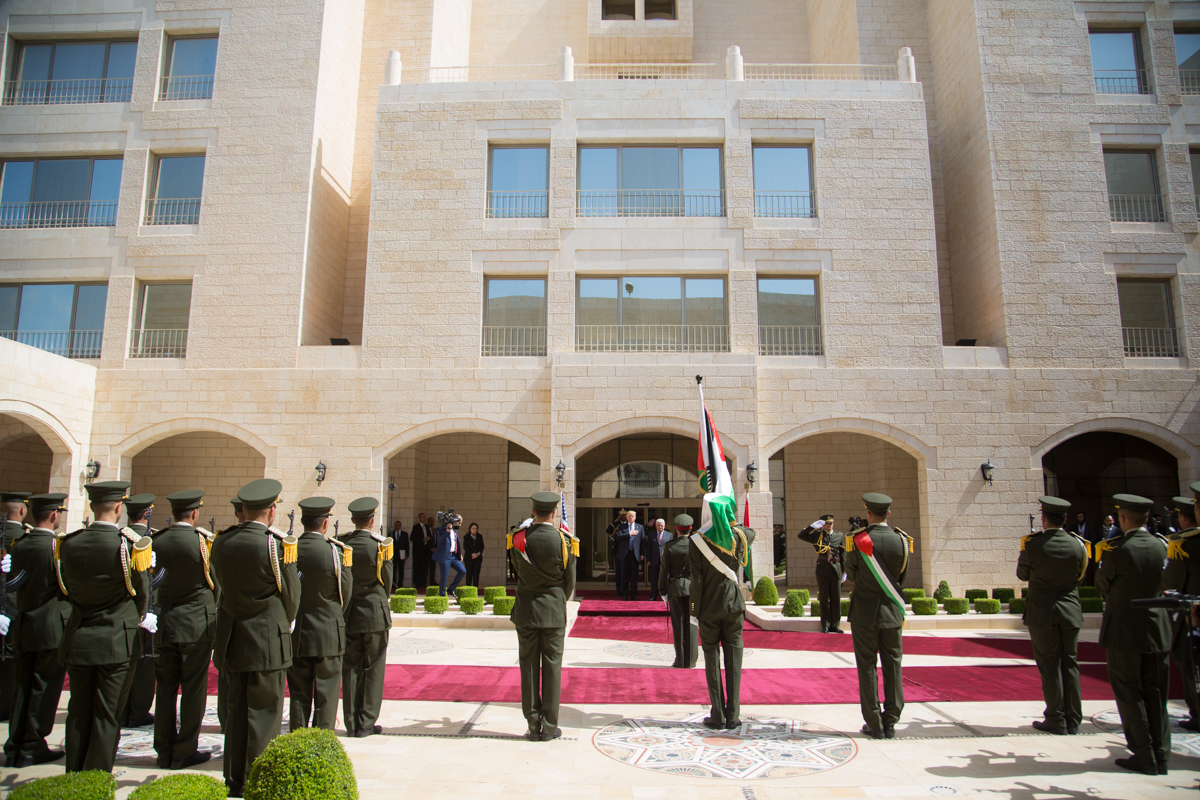

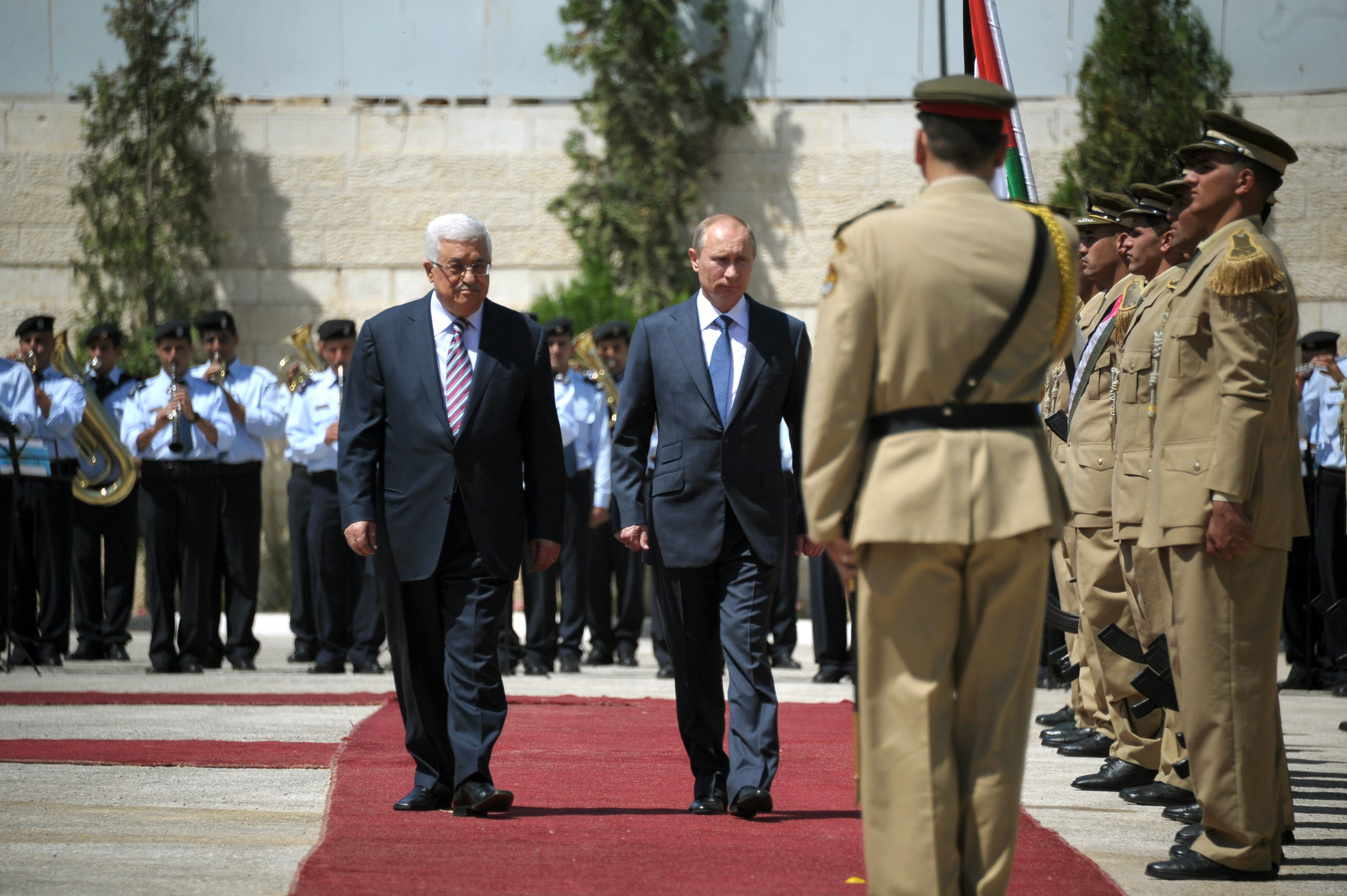

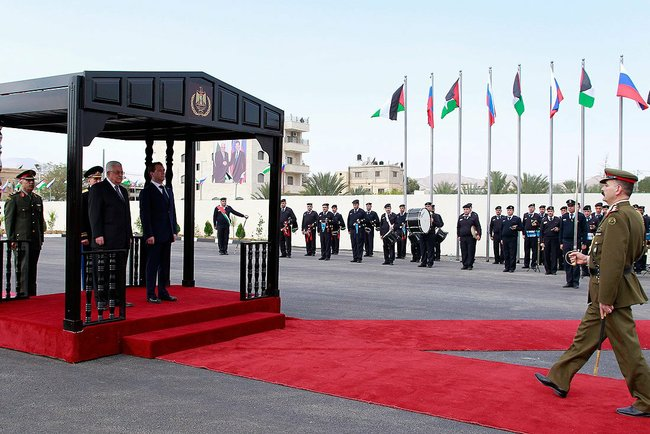

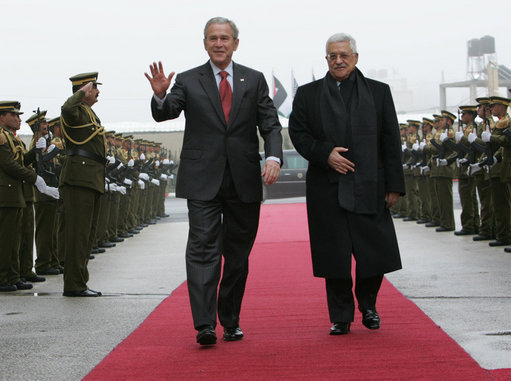

== See also ==
- Palestinian Civil Defence
- Palestinian Security Services
- Palestinian National Security Forces
- Palestinian Civil Police Force
- Palestinian Preventive Security
- Palestinian General Intelligence Service
- Palestinian Military Intelligence Service
