= Ad Hoc Liaison Committee =

Body that coordinates the delivery of international aid to Palestinians

The Ad Hoc Liaison Committee (AHLC) is a body whose primary function is to coordinate the delivery of international aid to Palestinians and the Palestinian Authority. It normally meets twice a year usually in New York or Brussels. The AHLC was established in November 1993.

The entities that provide such aid are categorized into seven groups: the Arab nations, the European Union, the United States, Japan, international institutions (including agencies of the UN system), European countries, and other nations. In July 2018, Australia ceased providing direct aid to the PA, saying the donations could increase the PA's capacity to pay Palestinians convicted of politically motivated violence, and that it will direct its funds through United Nations programs.

== Background ==
The AHLC was formed in the aftermath of the Oslo Accords, a set of peace agreements between Israel and the Palestine Liberation Organization (PLO). The committee was created to ensure effective coordination of international aid efforts and provide a forum for the Palestinian Authority and the Government of Israel to discuss economic, development, and security issues related to the peace process.

== Structure ==
The AHLC has 15 members: United States, European Union, United Nations, IMF, World Bank, Russia, Norway, Japan, Saudi Arabia, Canada, Palestinian Authority, Israel, Jordan, Egypt, and Tunisia. The AHLC receives reports from UNSCO, the Quartet, the IMF, as well as the World Bank, the latter acting as the AHLC Secretariat.

== Membership ==
The Ad Hoc Liaison Committee is chaired by Norway and co-sponsored by the United States and the European Union. Other key members include the IMF and the World Bank.

== Chairmanship ==
Meetings of the AHLC are chaired by Norway, a role for which it was nominated by Saudi Arabia when the US and the EU were at odds over which of them should be chair.

== Meetings ==
While in recent years meetings have been held biannually, in 2018, there were three meetings at ministerial level.

Following a virtual meeting in February 2021, a physical and virtual meeting was held in Oslo on 17 November 2021.

Following the outbreak of the Israel-Hamas war of October 2023, a special meeting was held in May 2024.
