= Amin al-Hindi =

Palestinian intelligence chief (1940–2010)

1st Director of the General Intelligence Service
- In office 1994 – April 2005
- President: Yasser Arafat; Rawhi Fattouh (acting); Mahmoud Abbas
- Preceded by: Position established
- Succeeded by: Ahmed Shenoura

Personal details
- Born: 9 January 1941 Gaza City, Mandatory Palestine
- Died: 17 August 2010 (aged 69) Amman, Jordan
- Occupation: Intelligence Chief of the Palestinian Authority

Amin al-Hindi (9 January 1941 – 17 August 2010) was a Palestinian politician who served as the intelligence chief of the Palestinian Authority. He was a leader of the Black September militant movement and was suspected of involvement in the Munich massacre at the 1972 Summer Olympics that resulted in the deaths of 11 Israeli athletes and coaches.

== Early life ==
Hindi was born in Gaza City on 9 January 1941 and was actively involved with Yasser Arafat in the Fatah movement that Arafat founded in 1959.

== Career ==
In its obituary, The New York Times described Hindi as one of the organizers of the Black September attack in Munich, in which 11 athletes and coaches who were members of the Israeli Olympic team at the 1972 Summer Games were taken hostage and murdered in team dormitories on the morning of September 5, 1972, though Hindi never acknowledged his involvement in the attack. Israeli security forces carried out a series of targeted killings of individuals believed to have been involved with the massacre; following the death of Abu Daoud, the Palestinian militant known as the planner, architect and mastermind of the Munich massacre, Hindi is thought to have been the last surviving individual who was connected to the killings.

Israel permitted him to return from exile in the 1990s following the Oslo Accords. He became a senior official in the Palestinian Authority and served as Director of the General Intelligence Service. In talks following the signing of the Oslo I Accord held in October 1993 in Taba, Egypt, al-Hindi, described as "the most sensitive delegate", was excluded from participating based on his involvement in the 1972 Olympics massacre; a spokesman from the Israeli Foreign Ministry stated "... the fact that we look to the future does not mean we have lost our sensibilities. Munich was a real trauma."

After calling for an intifada against Yasser Arafat, Hamas was blamed for instigating protests in August 1996 in the West Bank against the Palestinian Authority, with al-Hindi stating that "We have put our hands on messages from abroad instructing people inside the territories to stage riots...."

He headed the intelligence service until April 2005, when he was appointed to a cabinet level position as a special adviser to president Mahmoud Abbas. In that role he had frequent contact with Israeli military and security forces.

== Death ==
The Palestinian news agency Wafa reported that al-Hindi had died at age 69 on 17 August 2010, in Amman, Jordan, due to liver and pancreatic cancer. His body was transported from Jordan to the West Bank where ceremonies honoring him were held at the presidential headquarters of Mahmoud Abbas. His body was then transferred through Israel for burial in Gaza. His Gaza funeral was attended by members of the Fatah Central Committee and the Fatah Revolutionary Council. A procession traveled from his home in the Al-Rimal neighborhood to the Katiba Mosque.

Government offices
New office	Director of the General Intelligence Service; 1994–2005	Succeeded by Ahmed Shenoura
