= General Intelligence Service (Palestine) =

Palestinian intelligence agency

Palestinian General Intelligence Service
- الجهاز العام للاستخبارات الفلسطيني

Agency overview
- Formed: 1994
- Headquarters: Ramallah, Palestine
- Agency executive: Majed Faraj, Director
- Parent agency: Palestinian Security Services

The Palestinian General Intelligence Service (GIS; Arabic: الجهاز العام للاستخبارات الفلسطيني) is an intelligence agency responsible for internal security and intelligence of the State of Palestine. It was established in 1994 as part of the Palestinian Authority's efforts to create a unified security apparatus in the territories under its control. Majed Faraj is the current head of GIS.

The PGIS operates under the supervision of the Palestinian president, and the president appoints its director. Its primary responsibilities include gathering and analyzing intelligence on potential security threats, investigating crimes, and maintaining order and stability within the Palestinian territories.

== Directors ==
#	Image	Director	Term
1		Amin al-Hindi	1994 – April 2005
2		Ahmed Shenoura	2005 – 2007
3		Tawfik Tirawi	28 August 2007 – 21 November 2008
–		Mohamed Mansour (Acting)	2008 – 2009
4		Majed Faraj	15 September 2009 – present

== See also ==
- Palestinian Security Services
- Palestinian National Security Forces
- Palestinian Civil Police Force
- Palestinian Preventive Security
- Palestinian Military Intelligence Service
