= Palestinian Preventive Security =

Security apparatus of Palestine

- Al-'amn al-wiqa'i الأمن الوقائي

Agency overview
- Formed: 1994
- Jurisdiction: State of Palestine, Gaza Strip (until 2007)
- Headquarters: Ramallah, West Bank
- Agency executives: Iyad Aqra, Director; Nizar AlHajj, Deputy Director
- Parent agency: Palestinian Security Services

The Palestinian Preventive Security (PPS; Arabic: الأمن الوقائي, romanized: Al-’amn al-wiqā’ī), also known as Preventive Security Force (PSF; Arabic: جهاز الأمن الوقائي) or Preventive Security Service (PSS), is one of the security forces of the State of Palestine. It was established in 1994 by president Yasser Arafat in accordance with the Oslo Accords.

The PPS is an internal intelligence organization, part of the Palestinian Security Services, and led by the Minister of the Interior. Its main tasks are protecting the internal security of Palestine and the Palestinian Authority, and preventing crimes which target governmental departments and public bodies and institutions. It was the keeper of the Oslo peace process.

== Organization ==
The PPS is one of several intelligence services of Palestine. According to some sources, 5,000 plain-clothed members served in separate units in the West Bank and Gaza in 2006. In Gaza Strip, PPS security forces were led by Mohammed Dahlan until he and his soldiers were forced to leave by Hamas in 2007 after their defeat in Battle of Gaza.

In the late 1990s, the "Security and Protection Department" or so-called "Death Squad" was established, aimed at activists of Hamas and Islamic Jihad. In 2007, the estimated strength was 3,500 in the West Bank and 4,500 in Gaza. SPD worked closely with Israel's Internal Security Agencies in arresting, interrogating, and sometimes torturing Palestinians who were then arrested by Israel. In 2005, following Yasser Arafat's death, the PPS's Security and Protection Department was disbanded as part of the security sector reform process.

Many Palestinians think that Israel's military occupation, alleged repression, and displacement are facilitated by the Palestinian Authority and its forces. The Palestinian Center for Policy and Survey Research, Palestinian think tank located in Ramallah, found that in March 2023, for the first time since the authority's establishment, the majority of Palestinians believed that its dissolution or collapse was in their best interests. 66% of Palestinians living in West Bank, according to a June PCPSR survey, were in favor of the creation of armed groups that are not under the control of the government security forces.

=== 2007 reform ===
In November 2007, President Mahmoud Abba issued "Decree Law No. ( ) of 2007 Concerning the Preventive Security", which re-defined the Preventive Security. The Law is not approved by the Palestinian Legislative Council.

The Preventive Security is led by the Minister of the Interior and headed by the Director-General of the Directorate-General of the Preventive Security. According to the 2007 Law, the duties of the Preventive Security are:

1. Working to protect the Palestinian internal security.
2. Following up on crimes which threaten the internal security of the National Authority and/or those imposed thereon, as well as working towards their prevention.
3. Uncovering crimes which target governmental departments and public bodies and institutions, as well as the employees thereat.

== Leadership ==
Name	Location	Period	Notes / References
Jibril Rajoub	West Bank	1994–2002	Headed the Force until July 2002.
Majid Faraj	West Bank	1994–	Joined PSF from 1994, in charge of Bethlehem district in 2000, promoted to head of Military Intelligence in 2006, chief of General Intelligence Service in 2009.
Mohammed Dahlan	Gaza	1994–2002	First chief of the Palestinian Security Force in Gaza
Rashid Abu Shabak	Gaza	2002–2004	
Zuhair Manasra	West Bank	2002–2004	
Rashid Abu Shabak	West Bank & Gaza	2005–2007	In April 2005, became head of PSF in both West Bank and Gaza; appointed head of Palestinian Security Services in Feb 2006.
Suleiman Abu Mutlaq	Gaza	2005–2006	
Yousef Ali Issa	Gaza	2006–2007	
Ziad Hab Al-Reeh	West Bank	2005–2007	
Ziad Hab Al-Reeh		2007–2021	
Abdul Qader Al-Taamari		2021–2025	
Iyad Aqra		2025–present	
Nizar AlHaj		2025–present	Deputy Director of the Preventive Security Force

== Developments ==
=== Second Intifada ===
The PPS was accused by Israel of playing a covert role in the Second Intifada that erupted in September 2000 after Ariel Sharon's visit to the Temple Mount. In 2001, it shelled the house of General Jibril Rajoub, then colonel, who at the time was the PPS director. A number of PPS officers were also assassinated, injured and arrested. In April 2002, Sharon ordered the Operation Defensive Shield, the largest Israeli military campaign in the West Bank since its occupation in 1967. The headquarters of PPS in Beitunia was placed under a military siege, with intensive shelling by tanks and Apaches, reducing the headquarters to rubble, and injuring dozens of officers.

=== 2007 ===
On 14 June 2007, Hamas militants took over the Preventive Security building in Gaza City and the intelligence service headquarters in Gaza.

== See also ==
- Palestinian Civil Defence
- Palestinian Security Services
- Palestinian National Security Forces
- Palestinian Civil Police Force
- Palestinian General Intelligence Service
- Palestinian Military Intelligence Service
- Palestinian law
