= Badr Brigade (Jordan) =

Palestinian attachment

The Badr Brigade is a unit of around 1,500 Palestinian soldiers who receive their salaries from the Palestine Liberation Organization, but are attached to the Jordanian army.
